= List of woodpeckers =

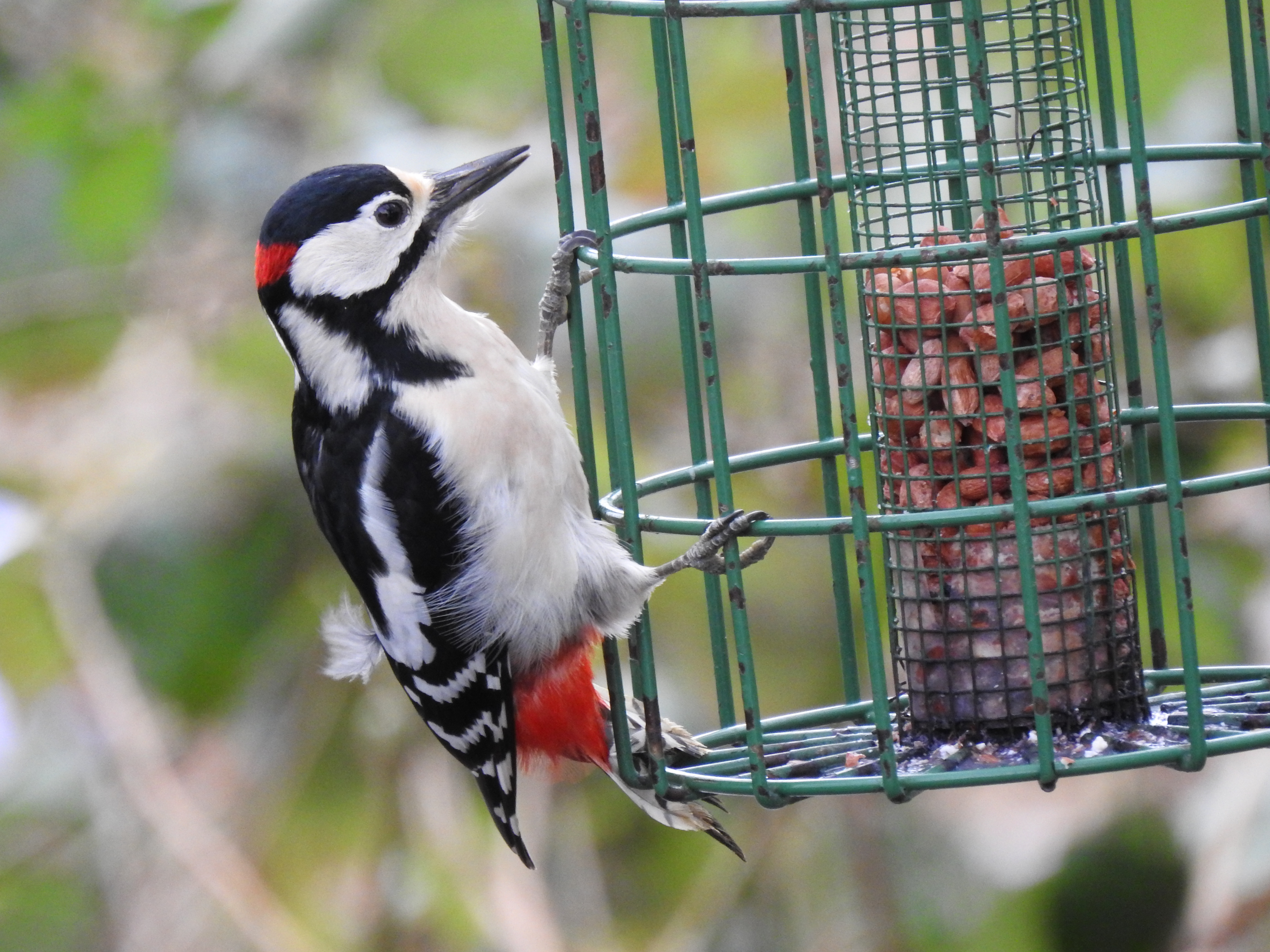
A male great spotted woodpecker

The International Ornithological Committee (IOC) recognizes these 241 species of woodpeckers which make up the family Picidae. They are distributed among 36 genera, six of which have only one species. One species, the Bermuda flicker, is extinct. The family's taxonomy is unsettled; the Clements taxonomy lists 235 species and BirdLife International's Handbook of the Birds of the World lists 254.

This list is presented according to the IOC taxonomic sequence and can also be sorted alphabetically by common name and binomial.

Common name	Binomial name + authority	IOC sequence
Eurasian wryneck	Jynx torquilla Linnaeus, 1758	1
Red-throated wryneck	Jynx ruficollis Wagler, 1830	2
Speckled piculet	Picumnus innominatus Burton, E, 1836	3
Bar-breasted piculet	Picumnus aurifrons Pelzeln, 1870	4
Lafresnaye's piculet	Picumnus lafresnayi Malherbe, 1862	5
Orinoco piculet	Picumnus pumilus Cabanis & Heine, 1863	6
Golden-spangled piculet	Picumnus exilis (Lichtenstein, MHC, 1823)	7
Ecuadorian piculet	Picumnus sclateri Taczanowski, 1877	8
Scaled piculet	Picumnus squamulatus Lafresnaye, 1854	9
White-bellied piculet	Picumnus spilogaster Sundevall, 1866	10
Arrowhead piculet	Picumnus minutissimus (Pallas, 1782)	11
Spotted piculet	Picumnus pygmaeus (Lichtenstein, MHC, 1823)	12
Speckle-chested piculet	Picumnus steindachneri Taczanowski, 1882	13
Varzea piculet	Picumnus varzeae Snethlage, E, 1912	14
White-barred piculet	Picumnus cirratus Temminck, 1825	15
Ocellated piculet	Picumnus dorbignyanus Lafresnaye, 1845	16
Ochre-collared piculet	Picumnus temminckii Lafresnaye, 1845	17
White-wedged piculet	Picumnus albosquamatus d'Orbigny, 1840	18
Rusty-necked piculet	Picumnus fuscus Pelzeln, 1870	19
Rufous-breasted piculet	Picumnus rufiventris (Bonaparte, 1838)	20
Ochraceous piculet	Picumnus limae Snethlage, E, 1924	21
Mottled piculet	Picumnus nebulosus Sundevall, 1866	22
Plain-breasted piculet	Picumnus castelnau Malherbe, 1862	23
Fine-barred piculet	Picumnus subtilis Stager, 1968	24
Olivaceous piculet	Picumnus olivaceus Lafresnaye, 1845	25
Greyish piculet	Picumnus granadensis Lafresnaye, 1847	26
Chestnut piculet	Picumnus cinnamomeus Wagler, 1829	27
African piculet	Verreauxia africana (Verreaux, J & Verreaux, É, 1855)	28
Rufous piculet	Sasia abnormis (Temminck, 1825)	29
White-browed piculet	Sasia ochracea Hodgson, 1837	30
Antillean piculet	Nesoctites micromegas (Sundevall, 1866)	31
Grey-and-buff woodpecker	Hemicircus concretus (Temminck, 1821)	32
Heart-spotted woodpecker	Hemicircus canente (Lesson, RP, 1832)	33
White woodpecker	Melanerpes candidus (Otto, 1796)	34
Lewis's woodpecker	Melanerpes lewis (Gray, GR, 1849)	35
Guadeloupe woodpecker	Melanerpes herminieri (Lesson, RP, 1830)	36
Puerto Rican woodpecker	Melanerpes portoricensis (Daudin, 1803)	37
Red-headed woodpecker	Melanerpes erythrocephalus (Linnaeus, 1758)	38
Acorn woodpecker	Melanerpes formicivorus (Swainson, 1827)	39
Yellow-tufted woodpecker	Melanerpes cruentatus (Boddaert, 1783)	40
Yellow-fronted woodpecker	Melanerpes flavifrons (Vieillot, 1818)	41
Golden-naped woodpecker	Melanerpes chrysauchen Salvin, 1870	42
Beautiful woodpecker	Melanerpes pulcher Sclater, PL, 1870	43
Black-cheeked woodpecker	Melanerpes pucherani (Malherbe, 1849)	44
White-fronted woodpecker	Melanerpes cactorum (d'Orbigny, 1840)	45
Hispaniolan woodpecker	Melanerpes striatus (Müller, PLS, 1776)	46
Jamaican woodpecker	Melanerpes radiolatus (Wagler, 1827)	47
Golden-cheeked woodpecker	Melanerpes chrysogenys (Vigors, 1839)	48
Grey-breasted woodpecker	Melanerpes hypopolius (Wagler, 1829)	49
Yucatan woodpecker	Melanerpes pygmaeus (Ridgway, 1885)	50
Red-crowned woodpecker	Melanerpes rubricapillus (Cabanis, 1862)	51
Gila woodpecker	Melanerpes uropygialis (Baird, SF, 1854)	52
Hoffmann's woodpecker	Melanerpes hoffmannii (Cabanis, 1862)	53
Golden-fronted woodpecker	Melanerpes aurifrons (Wagler, 1829)	54
Velasquez's woodpecker	Melanerpes santacruzi (Bonaparte, 1838)	55
Red-bellied woodpecker	Melanerpes carolinus (Linnaeus, 1758)	56
West Indian woodpecker	Melanerpes superciliaris (Temminck, 1827)	57
Williamson's sapsucker	Sphyrapicus thyroideus (Cassin, 1852)	58
Yellow-bellied sapsucker	Sphyrapicus varius (Linnaeus, 1766)	59
Red-naped sapsucker	Sphyrapicus nuchalis Baird, SF, 1858	60
Red-breasted sapsucker	Sphyrapicus ruber (Gmelin, JF, 1788)	61
Cuban green woodpecker	Xiphidiopicus percussus (Temminck, 1826)	62
Buff-spotted woodpecker	Pardipicus nivosus (Swainson, 1837)	63
Brown-eared woodpecker	Pardipicus caroli (Malherbe, 1852)	64
Ground woodpecker	Geocolaptes olivaceus (Gmelin, JF, 1788)	65
Fine-spotted woodpecker	Campethera punctuligera (Wagler, 1827)	66
Bennett's woodpecker	Campethera bennettii (Smith, A, 1836)	67
Speckle-throated woodpecker	Campethera scriptoricauda (Reichenow, 1896)	68
Nubian woodpecker	Campethera nubica (Boddaert, 1783)	69
Golden-tailed woodpecker	Campethera abingoni (Smith, A, 1836)	70
Mombasa woodpecker	Campethera mombassica (Fischer, GA & Reichenow, 1884)	71
Knysna woodpecker	Campethera notata (Lichtenstein, MHC, 1823)	72
Little green woodpecker	Campethera maculosa (Valenciennes, 1826)	73
Little spotted woodpecker	Campethera cailliautii (Malherbe, 1849)	74
Tullberg's woodpecker	Campethera tullbergi Sjöstedt, 1892	75
Fine-banded woodpecker	Campethera taeniolaema Reichenow & Neumann, 1895	76
Sulawesi pygmy woodpecker	Yungipicus temminckii (Malherbe, 1849)	77
Brown-capped pygmy woodpecker	Yungipicus nanus (Vigors, 1832)	78
Grey-capped pygmy woodpecker	Yungipicus canicapillus (Blyth, 1845)	79
Philippine pygmy woodpecker	Yungipicus maculatus (Scopoli, 1786)	80
Sulu pygmy woodpecker	Yungipicus ramsayi Hargitt, 1881	81
Sunda pygmy woodpecker	Yungipicus moluccensis (Gmelin, JF, 1788)	82
Japanese pygmy woodpecker	Yungipicus kizuki (Temminck, 1836)	83
Eurasian three-toed woodpecker	Picoides tridactylus (Linnaeus, 1758)	84
American three-toed woodpecker	Picoides dorsalis Baird, SF, 1858	85
Black-backed woodpecker	Picoides arcticus (Swainson, 1832)	86
Arabian woodpecker	Dendrocoptes dorae (Bates, GL & Kinnear, 1935)	87
Brown-fronted woodpecker	Dendrocoptes auriceps (Vigors, 1831)	88
Middle spotted woodpecker	Dendrocoptes medius (Linnaeus, 1758)	89
Yellow-crowned woodpecker	Leiopicus mahrattensis (Latham, 1801)	90
Bearded woodpecker	Chloropicus namaquus (Lichtenstein, AAH, 1793)	91
Yellow-crested woodpecker	Chloropicus xantholophus Hargitt, 1883	92
Fire-bellied woodpecker	Chloropicus pyrrhogaster (Malherbe, 1845)	93
Little grey woodpecker	Dendropicos elachus Oberholser, 1919	94
Speckle-breasted woodpecker	Dendropicos poecilolaemus Reichenow, 1893	95
Abyssinian woodpecker	Dendropicos abyssinicus (Stanley, 1814)	96
Cardinal woodpecker	Dendropicos fuscescens (Vieillot, 1818)	97
Gabon woodpecker	Dendropicos gabonensis (Verreaux, J & Verreaux, É, 1851)	98
Melancholy woodpecker	Dendropicos lugubris Hartlaub, 1857	99
Stierling's woodpecker	Dendropicos stierlingi Reichenow, 1901	100
Elliot's woodpecker	Dendropicos elliotii (Cassin, 1863)	101
African grey woodpecker	Dendropicos goertae (Müller, PLS, 1776)	102
Eastern grey woodpecker	Dendropicos spodocephalus (Bonaparte, 1850)	103
Olive woodpecker	Dendropicos griseocephalus (Boddaert, 1783)	104
Brown-backed woodpecker	Dendropicos obsoletus (Wagler, 1829)	105
Nuttall's woodpecker	Dryobates nuttallii (Gambel, 1843)	106
Ladder-backed woodpecker	Dryobates scalaris (Wagler, 1829)	107
Downy woodpecker	Dryobates pubescens (Linnaeus, 1766)	108
Crimson-naped woodpecker	Dryobates cathpharius (Blyth, 1843)	109
Necklaced woodpecker	Dryobates pernyii (Verreaux, J, 1867)	110
Lesser spotted woodpecker	Dryobates minor (Linnaeus, 1758)	111
Little woodpecker	Veniliornis passerinus (Linnaeus, 1766)	112
Dot-fronted woodpecker	Veniliornis frontalis (Cabanis, 1883)	113
White-spotted woodpecker	Veniliornis spilogaster (Wagler, 1827)	114
Checkered woodpecker	Veniliornis mixtus (Boddaert, 1783)	115
Striped woodpecker	Veniliornis lignarius (Molina, 1782)	116
Scarlet-backed woodpecker	Veniliornis callonotus (Waterhouse, 1841)	117
Yellow-vented woodpecker	Veniliornis dignus (Sclater, PL & Salvin, 1877)	118
Bar-bellied woodpecker	Veniliornis nigriceps (d'Orbigny, 1840)	119
Blood-colored woodpecker	Veniliornis sanguineus (Lichtenstein, AAH, 1793)	120
Red-rumped woodpecker	Veniliornis kirkii (Malherbe, 1845)	121
Red-stained woodpecker	Veniliornis affinis (Swainson, 1821)	122
Choco woodpecker	Veniliornis chocoensis Todd, 1919	123
Golden-collared woodpecker	Veniliornis cassini (Malherbe, 1862)	124
Yellow-eared woodpecker	Veniliornis maculifrons (Spix, 1824)	125
Red-cockaded woodpecker	Leuconotopicus borealis (Vieillot, 1809)	126
Smoky-brown woodpecker	Leuconotopicus fumigatus (d'Orbigny, 1840)	127
Arizona woodpecker	Leuconotopicus arizonae (Hargitt, 1886)	128
Strickland's woodpecker	Leuconotopicus stricklandi (Malherbe, 1845)	129
Hairy woodpecker	Leuconotopicus villosus (Linnaeus, 1766)	130
White-headed woodpecker	Leuconotopicus albolarvatus (Cassin, 1850)	131
Rufous-bellied woodpecker	Dendrocopos hyperythrus (Vigors, 1831)	132
Fulvous-breasted woodpecker	Dendrocopos macei (Vieillot, 1818)	133
Freckle-breasted woodpecker	Dendrocopos analis (Bonaparte, 1850)	134
Stripe-breasted woodpecker	Dendrocopos atratus (Blyth, 1849)	135
Darjeeling woodpecker	Dendrocopos darjellensis (Blyth, 1845)	136
Himalayan woodpecker	Dendrocopos himalayensis (Jardine & Selby, 1831)	137
Sind woodpecker	Dendrocopos assimilis (Blyth, 1849)	138
Syrian woodpecker	Dendrocopos syriacus (Hemprich & Ehrenberg, 1833)	139
White-winged woodpecker	Dendrocopos leucopterus (Salvadori, 1871)	140
Great spotted woodpecker	Dendrocopos major (Linnaeus, 1758)	141
Okinawa woodpecker	Dendrocopos noguchii (Seebohm, 1887)	142
White-backed woodpecker	Dendrocopos leucotos (Bechstein, 1802)	143
Rufous-winged woodpecker	Piculus simplex (Salvin, 1870)	144
Stripe-cheeked woodpecker	Piculus callopterus (Lawrence, 1862)	145
White-throated woodpecker	Piculus leucolaemus (Natterer & Malherbe, 1845)	146
Lita woodpecker	Piculus litae (Rothschild, 1901)	147
Yellow-throated woodpecker	Piculus flavigula (Boddaert, 1783)	148
Golden-green woodpecker	Piculus chrysochloros (Vieillot, 1818)	149
Yellow-browed woodpecker	Piculus aurulentus (Temminck, 1821)	150
Golden-olive woodpecker	Colaptes rubiginosus (Swainson, 1820)	151
Bronze-winged woodpecker	Colaptes aeruginosus (Malherbe, 1862)	152
Grey-crowned woodpecker	Colaptes auricularis (Salvin & Godman, 1889)	153
Crimson-mantled woodpecker	Colaptes rivolii (Boissonneau, 1840)	154
Black-necked woodpecker	Colaptes atricollis (Malherbe, 1850)	155
Spot-breasted woodpecker	Colaptes punctigula (Boddaert, 1783)	156
Green-barred woodpecker	Colaptes melanochloros (Gmelin, JF, 1788)	157
Northern flicker	Colaptes auratus (Linnaeus, 1758)	158
Guatemalan flicker	Colaptes mixicanoides Lafresnaye, 1844	159
Gilded flicker	Colaptes chrysoides (Malherbe, 1852)	160
Bermuda flicker	Colaptes oceanicus Olson, 2013	161
Fernandina's flicker	Colaptes fernandinae Vigors, 1827	162
Chilean flicker	Colaptes pitius (Molina, 1782)	163
Andean flicker	Colaptes rupicola d'Orbigny, 1840	164
Campo flicker	Colaptes campestris (Vieillot, 1818)	165
Cinnamon woodpecker	Celeus loricatus (Reichenbach, 1854)	165
Waved woodpecker	Celeus undatus (Linnaeus, 1766)	167
Chestnut-colored woodpecker	Celeus castaneus (Wagler, 1829)	168
Chestnut woodpecker	Celeus elegans (Müller, PLS, 1776)	169
Pale-crested woodpecker	Celeus lugubris (Malherbe, 1851)	170
Blond-crested woodpecker	Celeus flavescens (Gmelin, JF, 1788)	171
Ochre-backed woodpecker	Celeus ochraceus (Spix, 1824)	121
Cream-colored woodpecker	Celeus flavus (Müller, PLS, 1776)	173
Rufous-headed woodpecker	Celeus spectabilis Sclater, PL & Salvin, 1880	174
Kaempfer's woodpecker	Celeus obrieni Short, 1973	175
Ringed woodpecker	Celeus torquatus (Boddaert, 1783)	176
Helmeted woodpecker	Celeus galeatus (Temminck, 1822)	177
Black-bodied woodpecker	Dryocopus schulzii (Cabanis, 1882)	178
Lineated woodpecker	Dryocopus lineatus (Linnaeus, 1766)	179
Pileated woodpecker	Dryocopus pileatus (Linnaeus, 1758)	180
White-bellied woodpecker	Dryocopus javensis (Horsfield, 1821)	181
Andaman woodpecker	Dryocopus hodgei (Blyth, 1860)	182
Black woodpecker	Dryocopus martius (Linnaeus, 1758)	183
Powerful woodpecker	Campephilus pollens (Bonaparte, 1845)	184
Splendid woodpecker	Campephilus splendens Hargitt, 1889	185
Crimson-bellied woodpecker	Campephilus haematogaster (Tschudi, 1844)	186
Red-necked woodpecker	Campephilus rubricollis (Boddaert, 1783)	187
Robust woodpecker	Campephilus robustus (Lichtenstein, MHC, 1818)	188
Crimson-crested woodpecker	Campephilus melanoleucos (Gmelin, JF, 1788)	189
Pale-billed woodpecker	Campephilus guatemalensis (Hartlaub, 1844)	190
Guayaquil woodpecker	Campephilus gayaquilensis (Lesson, RP, 1845)	191
Cream-backed woodpecker	Campephilus leucopogon (Valenciennes, 1826)	192
Magellanic woodpecker	Campephilus magellanicus (King, PP, 1827)	193
Ivory-billed woodpecker	Campephilus principalis (Linnaeus, 1758)	194
Imperial woodpecker	Campephilus imperialis (Gould, 1832)	195
Banded woodpecker	Chrysophlegma miniaceum (Pennant, 1769)	196
Checker-throated woodpecker	Chrysophlegma mentale (Temminck, 1826)	197
Greater yellownape	Chrysophlegma flavinucha (Gould, 1834)	198
Lesser yellownape	Picus chlorolophus Vieillot, 1818	199
Crimson-winged woodpecker	Picus puniceus Horsfield, 1821	200
Streak-breasted woodpecker	Picus viridanus Blyth, 1843	201
Laced woodpecker	Picus vittatus Vieillot, 1818	202
Streak-throated woodpecker	Picus xanthopygaeus (Gray, JE & Gray, GR, 1847)	203
Scaly-bellied woodpecker	Picus squamatus Vigors, 1831	204
Japanese green woodpecker	Picus awokera Temminck, 1836	205
European green woodpecker	Picus viridis Linnaeus, 1758	206
Iberian green woodpecker	Picus sharpei (Saunders, H, 1872)	207
Levaillant's woodpecker	Picus vaillantii (Malherbe, 1847)	208
Red-collared woodpecker	Picus rabieri (Oustalet, 1898)	209
Black-headed woodpecker	Picus erythropygius (Elliot, DG, 1865)	210
Grey-headed woodpecker	Picus canus Gmelin, JF, 1788	211
Sumatran woodpecker	Picus dedemi (van Oort, 1911)	212
Himalayan flameback	Dinopium shorii (Vigors, 1831)	213
Common flameback	Dinopium javanense (Ljungh, 1797)	214
Spot-throated flameback	Dinopium everetti (Tweeddale, 1878)	215
Black-rumped flameback	Dinopium benghalense (Linnaeus, 1758)	216
Red-backed flameback	Dinopium psarodes (Lichtenstein, AAH, 1793)	217
Orange-backed woodpecker	Chrysocolaptes validus (Temminck, 1825)	218
Buff-spotted flameback	Chrysocolaptes lucidus (Scopoli, 1786)	219
Luzon flameback	Chrysocolaptes haematribon (Wagler, 1827)	220
Yellow-faced flameback	Chrysocolaptes xanthocephalus Walden & Layard, EL, 1872	221
Red-headed flameback	Chrysocolaptes erythrocephalus Sharpe, 1877	222
Javan flameback	Chrysocolaptes strictus (Horsfield, 1821)	223
Greater flameback	Chrysocolaptes guttacristatus (Tickell, 1833)	224
Malabar flameback	Chrysocolaptes socialis Koelz, 1939	225
Crimson-backed flameback	Chrysocolaptes stricklandi (Layard, EL, 1854)	226
White-naped woodpecker	Chrysocolaptes festivus (Boddaert, 1783)	227
Pale-headed woodpecker	Gecinulus grantia (Horsfield, 1840)	228
Bamboo woodpecker	Gecinulus viridis Blyth, 1862	229
Olive-backed woodpecker	Gecinulus rafflesii (Vigors, 1830)	230
Maroon woodpecker	Blythipicus rubiginosus (Swainson, 1837)	231
Bay woodpecker	Blythipicus pyrrhotis (Hodgson, 1837)	232
Rufous woodpecker	Micropternus brachyurus (Vieillot, 1818)	233
Buff-rumped woodpecker	Meiglyptes grammithorax (Malherbe, 1862)	234
Zebra woodpecker	Meiglyptes tristis (Horsfield, 1821)	235
Black-and-buff woodpecker	Meiglyptes jugularis (Blyth, 1845)	236
Buff-necked woodpecker	Meiglyptes tukki (Lesson, RP, 1839)	237
Ashy woodpecker	Mulleripicus fulvus (Quoy & Gaimard, 1832)	238
Northern sooty woodpecker	Mulleripicus funebris (Valenciennes, 1826)	239
Southern sooty woodpecker	Mulleripicus fuliginosus Tweeddale, 1877	240
Great slaty woodpecker	Mulleripicus pulverulentus (Temminck, 1826)	241
