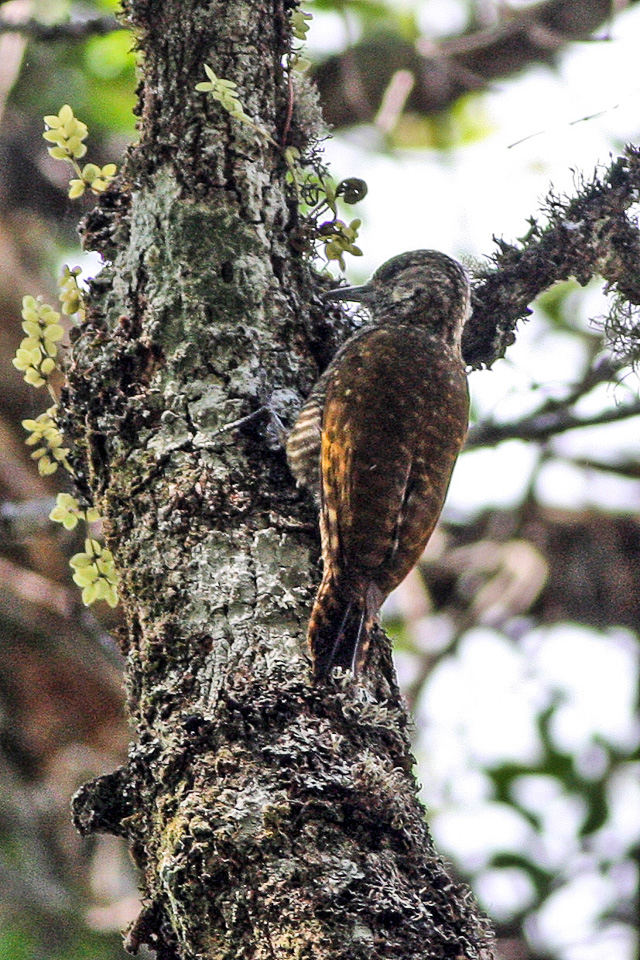

Conservation status
- Least Concern (IUCN 3.1)

Scientific classification
- Kingdom: Animalia
- Phylum: Chordata
- Class: Aves
- Order: Piciformes
- Family: Picidae
- Genus: Veniliornis
- Species: V. frontalis

Binomial name
- Veniliornis frontalis (Cabanis, 1883)

Synonyms
- Dryobates frontalis

= Dot-fronted woodpecker =

Species of bird

The dot-fronted woodpecker (Veniliornis frontalis) is a species of bird in subfamily Picinae of the woodpecker family Picidae. It is found in Argentina and Bolivia.

== Taxonomy and systematics ==
The International Ornithological Committee and BirdLife International's Handbook of the Birds of the World place the dot-fronted woodpecker in genus Veniliornis. However, starting in 2018, the American Ornithological Society and the Clements taxonomy moved all species of genus Veniliornis into genus Dryobates. The dot-fronted woodpecker and little woodpecker (V. (or D.) passerinus) sometimes hybridize, and some authors have treated them as conspecific.

The taxonomic systems agree that the dot-fronted woodpecker is monotypic.

== Description ==
The dot-fronted woodpecker is about 16 cm (6.3 in) long and weighs 30 to 40 g (1.1 to 1.4 oz). Males and females have the same plumage except on their heads. Males have an olive to gray-brown forehead ("front") with many white spots and are red from the crown to the nape with dark gray feather bases showing through. The female is olive-brown from forehead to nape with white spots throughout. Adults of both sexes have a mostly olive-brown face with a thin white supercilium and a thin white "moustache". Their upperparts are mostly yellowish olive with golden feather tips and pale bars and streaks. Their flight feathers are brown with wide yellow-green edges and pale bars on the inner webs. Their tail is dark brown with a yellow wash and thin whitish bars on the feathers. Their underparts are olive-gray with narrow whitish bars. The iris is dark brown, the longish beak blackish with a paler mandible, and the legs are dark gray. Juveniles are duller and grayer than adults and both sexes have some red on the crown, the male more than the female.

== Distribution and habitat ==
The dot-fronted woodpecker is found on the east side of the Andes from Bolivia's Cochabamba and Santa Cruz departments south to Tucumán Province in Argentina. It inhabits dry montane woodland, humid forest, and the transition zone between them. In elevation it ranges as high as 2,000 m (6,600 ft) but generally occurs lower.

== Behavior ==
=== Movement ===
The dot-fronted woodpecker tends to move to lower elevations outside the breeding season.

=== Feeding ===
The dot-fronted woodpecker typically forages near the ground on tree trunks and small branches. Its diet has not been described.

=== Breeding ===
The dot-fronted woodpecker's breeding season has not been fully defined but appears to include at least September to November. The single known nest cavity was about 8 m (25 ft) above the ground in a dead tree. Nothing else is known about the species' breeding biology.

=== Vocalization ===
The dot-fronted woodpecker "makes [a] series of 8–10 'juíc!' or 'jíc!' calls, or a rather harsh 'wík!'."

== Status ==
The IUCN has assessed the dot-fronted woodpecker as being of Least Concern, though it has a somewhat limited range and its population size is not known and is believed to be decreasing. No immediate threats have been identified. It occurs in at least two national parks but is thought "generally rather uncommon". "Very poorly known species; research required on its ecology and reproduction."
