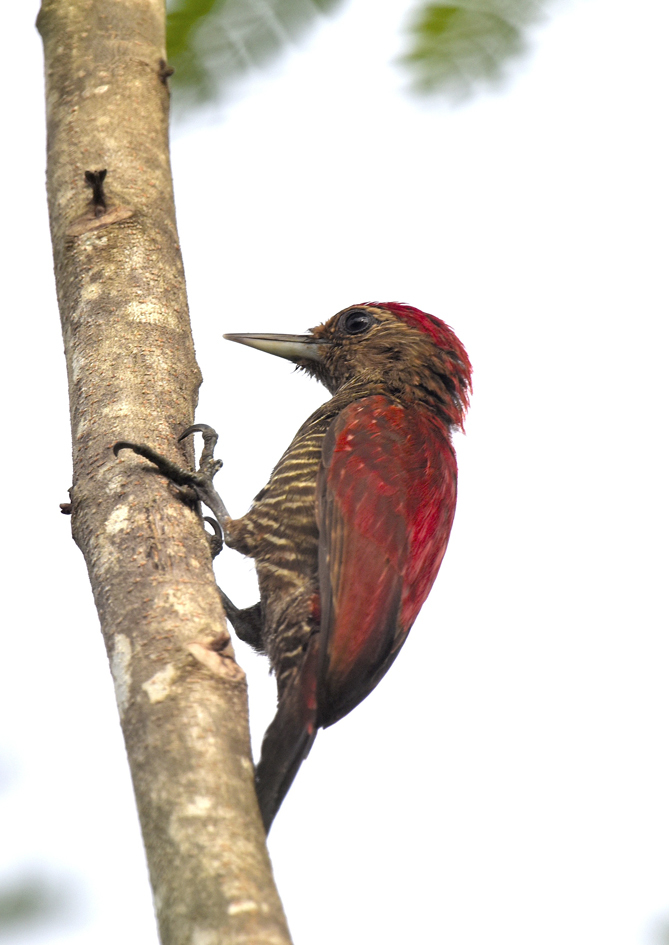

Conservation status
- Least Concern (IUCN 3.1)

Scientific classification
- Kingdom: Animalia
- Phylum: Chordata
- Class: Aves
- Order: Piciformes
- Family: Picidae
- Genus: Veniliornis
- Species: V. sanguineus

Binomial name
- Veniliornis sanguineus (Lichtenstein, AAH, 1793)

Synonyms
- Dryobates sanguineus

= Blood-colored woodpecker =

Species of bird

The blood-coloured woodpecker (Veniliornis sanguineus) is a species of bird in subfamily Picinae of the woodpecker family Picidae. It is found in Guyana and Suriname.

== Taxonomy and systematics ==
The International Ornithological Committee and BirdLife International's Handbook of the Birds of the World place the blood-coloured woodpecker in genus Veniliornis. However, starting in 2018, the American Ornithological Society and the Clements taxonomy moved all species of genus Veniliornis into genus Dryobates.

The taxonomic systems agree that the blood-coloured woodpecker is monotypic.

== Description ==
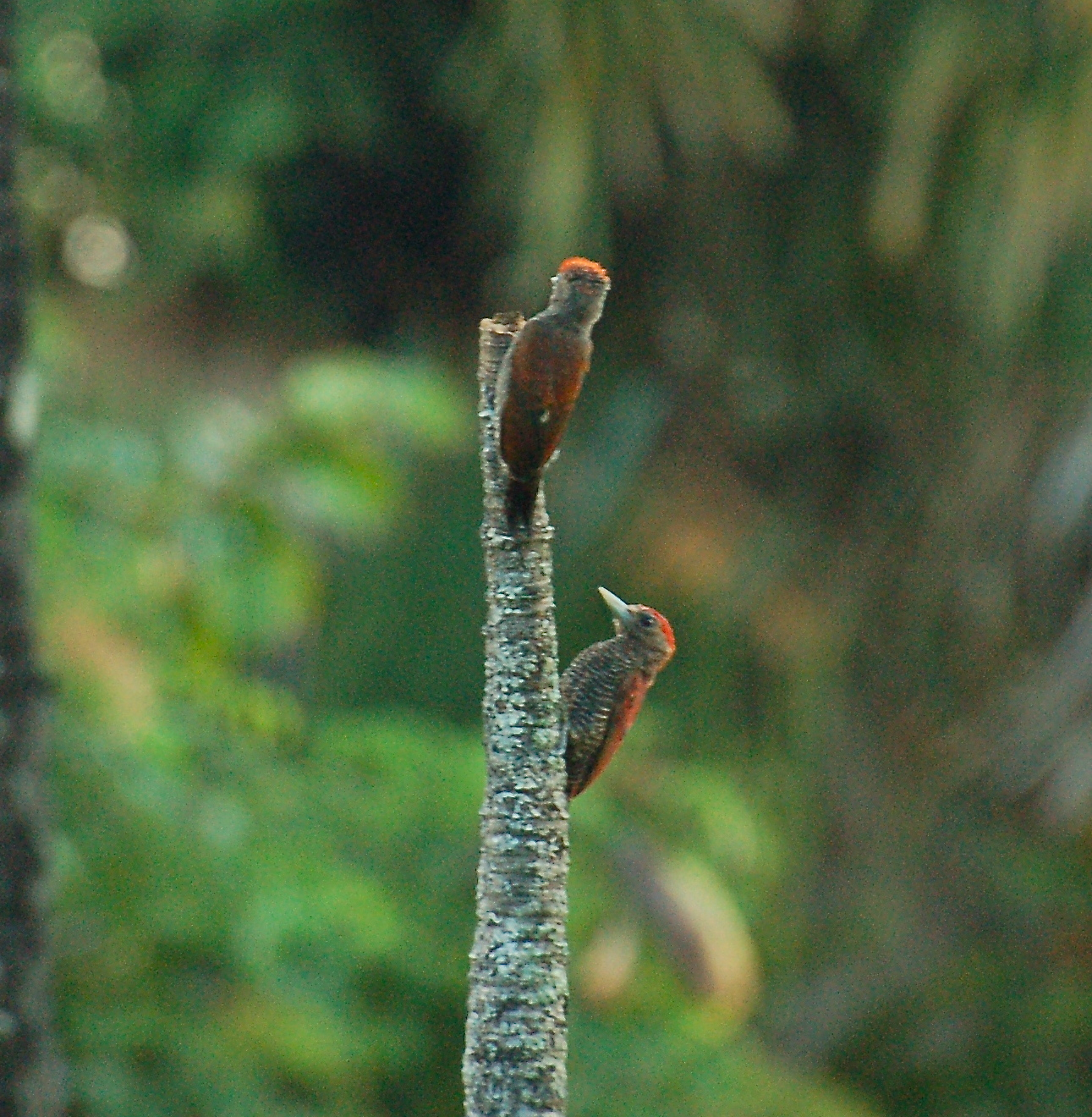
A pair in Georgetown Botanical Gardens, Guyana

The blood-coloured woodpecker is about 13 cm (5.1 in) long and weighs 23 to 30 g (0.81 to 1.1 oz). Males and females have the same plumage except on their heads. Adults of both sexes have a mostly brown face. Males are crimson-red from crown to nape with brown feather bases showing through. The female has a brown crown with thin white feather tips. Both sexes' upperparts are dark crimson-red with greenish-brown bases to the feathers. Their flight feathers are dark brown with greenish brown edges on the primaries and wide crimson edges on the secondaries and tertials. Their tail is dark brown. Their underparts are dark brownish with off-white bars throughout. The iris is dark red-brown, the longish beak dark gray with a lighter tip, and the legs are blackish. Juveniles are generally duller and browner than adults.

== Distribution and habitat ==
Though some sources say that the blood-coloured woodpecker is found in "the Guianas", the South American Classification Committee of the American Ornithological Society has records only in Guyana and Suriname, and not French Guiana. It is a bird of the coastal lowlands, where it inhabits mangroves, swamp forest, and sometimes coffee plantations. The blood-coloured woodpecker is a year-round resident throughout its range.

== Behaviour ==
=== Feeding ===
The blood-coloured woodpecker forages in trees and shrubs, typically singly or in pairs. Its diet includes ants, beetles, and caterpillars.

=== Breeding ===
The blood-coloured woodpecker has been recorded breeding in Suriname in February, March, and between May and November. Both sexes excavate the nest hole, usually low to the ground in a stump or branch. Excavation may take up to two months. The clutch is usually one or two eggs and sometimes three. Both parents incubate the eggs and provision nestlings and fledglings. The incubation period and time to fledging are not known.

=== Vocal and non-vocal sounds ===
The blood-coloured woodpecker's most common call is "single 'keek' notes". It also gives a "fast series of c. 16 'wih' notes". Both sexes drum.

== Status ==
The IUCN has assessed the blood-coloured woodpecker as being of Least Concern. Though it has a limited range and its population size is not known, the latter is believed to be stable. No immediate threats have been identified. It is "[f]airly widespread in its range, but restricted to lowlands of the Guianas." Habitat loss "could become a threat".
