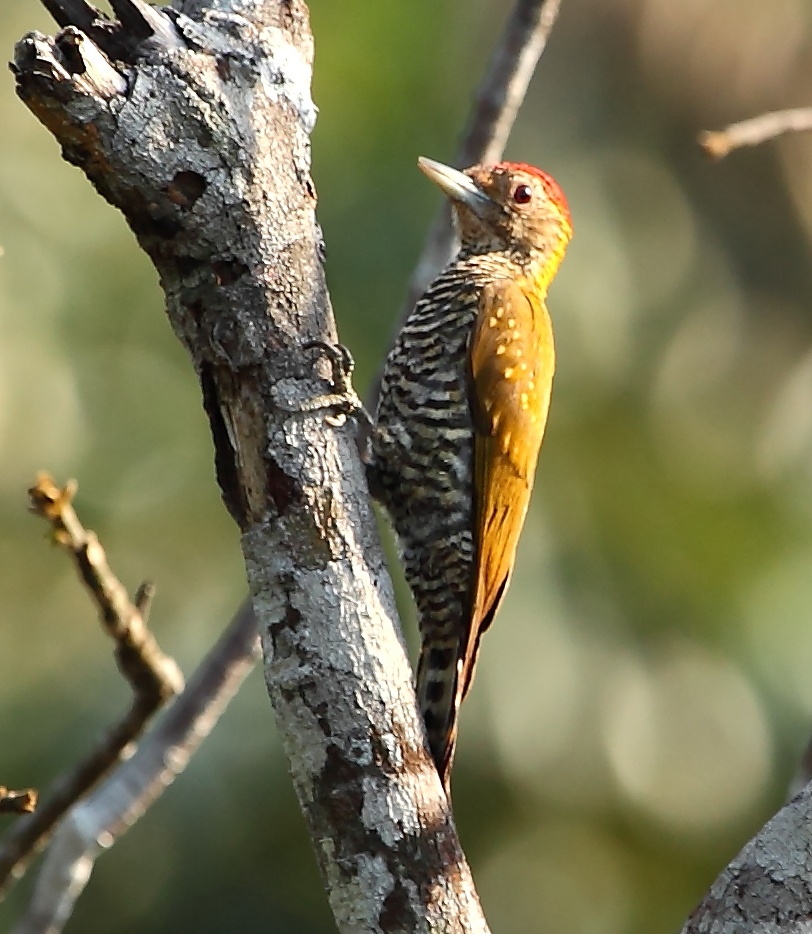
- A male at Manaus, Amazonas state, Brazil

Conservation status
- Least Concern (IUCN 3.1)

Scientific classification
- Kingdom: Animalia
- Phylum: Chordata
- Class: Aves
- Order: Piciformes
- Family: Picidae
- Genus: Veniliornis
- Species: V. cassini

Binomial name
- Veniliornis cassini (Malherbe, 1862)

Synonyms
- Dryobates cassini

= Golden-collared woodpecker =

Species of bird

The golden-collared woodpecker (Veniliornis cassini) is a species of bird in subfamily Picinae of the woodpecker family Picidae. It is found in Brazil, the Guianas, and Venezuela.

== Taxonomy and systematics ==
The International Ornithological Committee and BirdLife International's Handbook of the Birds of the World place the golden-collared woodpecker in genus Veniliornis. However, starting in 2018, the American Ornithological Society and the Clements taxonomy moved all species of genus Veniliornis into genus Dryobates.

The golden-collared woodpecker is monotypic. However, what is now the Choco woodpecker (V. (or D.) chocoensis) was at one time considered a subspecies of it.

== Description ==
The golden-collared woodpecker is about 16 cm (6.3 in) long and weighs about 24 to 38 g (0.85 to 1.3 oz). Males and females have the same plumage except on their heads. Males have a red crown with grayish black feather bases that show through. The female has a brown crown with a green tinge and whitish yellow spots on the rear. Adults of both sexes have a mostly buffish white face with fine darker streaks and a golden-yellow nape and hindneck. Their upperparts are mostly yellowish green with a bronzy tinge and sometimes yellowish barring on the rump. Their flight feathers are dark brown with greenish edges and white bars on the secondaries and tertials. Their tail is dark brown with paler bars on most feathers and some white on the outer two pairs. Their underparts are white to pale buffish white barred with black to brownish black. The iris is dark brown to red-brown, the longish beak dark gray with a paler tip, and the legs are olive to dark gray or blackish. Juveniles resemble adults but have a darker face and greener upperparts; both sexes have some red on the crown.

== Distribution and habitat ==
The golden-collared woodpecker is found from Amazonas and Bolívar states in Venezuela east and south through the Guianas and Brazil north of the Amazon between the Rio Negro and Amapá. It inhabits the interior and clearings in rainforest and also more open landscapes with trees and shrubs. In elevation it ranges from sea level to 1,500 m (4,900 ft).

== Behavior ==
=== Movement ===
The golden-collared woodpecker is believed to be a year-round resident throughout its range.

=== Feeding ===
The golden-collared woodpecker usually forages alone but does join mixed species feeding flocks. It often hunts in the canopy. Its diet has not been detailed but is known to include Cerambycidae beetles.

=== Breeding ===
Nothing is known about the golden-collared woodpecker's breeding biology.

=== Vocalization ===
The golden-collared woodpecker is usually rather silent. It does make "a series of 33–35 nasal 'khir' notes, rising in frequency" that is also described as a "loud, upslurred, rattling trill".

== Status ==
The IUCN has assessed the golden-collared woodpecker as being of Least Concern. It has a large range, and though its population size is not known it is believed to be stable. No immediate threats have been identified. "A very poorly known canopy-dwelling woodpecker; possibly not uncommon, but difficult to observe."
