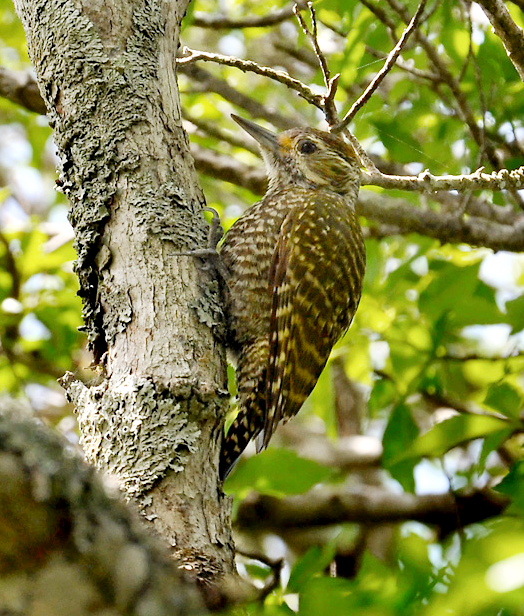
- A male white-spotted woodpecker at Rocha, Uruguay

Conservation status
- Least Concern (IUCN 3.1)

Scientific classification
- Kingdom: Animalia
- Phylum: Chordata
- Class: Aves
- Order: Piciformes
- Family: Picidae
- Genus: Veniliornis
- Species: V. spilogaster

Binomial name
- Veniliornis spilogaster (Wagler, 1827)

Synonyms
- Dryobates spilogaster

= White-spotted woodpecker =

Species of bird

The white-spotted woodpecker (Veniliornis spilogaster) is a species of bird in subfamily Picinae of the woodpecker family Picidae. It is found in Argentina, Brazil, Paraguay, and Uruguay.

== Taxonomy and systematics ==
The International Ornithological Committee and BirdLife International's Handbook of the Birds of the World place the white-spotted woodpecker in genus Veniliornis. However, starting in 2018, the American Ornithological Society and the Clements taxonomy moved all species of genus Veniliornis into genus Dryobates.

The taxonomic systems agree that the white-spotted woodpecker is monotypic.

== Description ==
The white-spotted woodpecker is 16 to 19.5 cm (6.3 to 7.7 in) long and weighs 35 to 45 g (1.2 to 1.6 oz). Males and females have the same plumage except on their heads. Males have a buffy to olive forehead, a blackish brown crown with very narrow red streaks, and an olive-green hindneck. The female has an olive-brown crown with fine white spots. Adults of both sexes have a mostly brownish face with a thin white supercilium, a thin white "moustache", and white speckles throughout. Their upperparts are mostly olive-green with yellowish to white feather edges that view as bars. Their flight feathers are dark brown with whitish bars. Their tail is dark brown with narrow off-white bars on the feathers. Their underparts are dark olive with heavy yellowish white streaks on the throat, yellowish white bars or spots on the breast, and heavy yellowish white bars on the belly and undertail coverts. The iris is deep chestnut brown, the beak blackish gray with a paler base, and the legs are olive or olive-gray. Males have a longer bill than females. Juveniles are very like adults but with fainter and less regular barring on their upperparts.

== Distribution and habitat ==
The white-spotted woodpecker is found from Goiás and Minas Gerais in Brazil south through southeastern Paraguay and most of Uruguay into northeastern Argentina as far as Entre Ríos Province. It inhabits a variety of wooded landscapes including humid lowland forest, gallery forest, isolated patches of forest, open to very open woodland, and lightly wooded parks.

== Behavior ==
=== Movement ===
The white-spotted woodpecker is a year-round resident throughout its range.

=== Feeding ===
The white-spotted woodpecker forages on a variety of substrates including tree trunks, saplings, and fence posts. It pecks and hammers to extract beetle larvae and other insects and also plucks fruit and berries.

=== Breeding ===
The white-spotted woodpecker appears to breed between July and December. It excavates nest cavities within a few meters of the ground. The clutch size, incubation period, time to fledging, and details of parental care are not known.

=== Vocal and non-vocal sounds ===
The white-spotted woodpecker has a large vocal repertoire including "cheékit ch che che che che che", "cheékit", "ti-rra-rra", "reh-reh-reh-reh", and (in alarm) single "pic" notes. It also makes a "tapping signal in groups of 2–4, with pauses and single taps".

== Status ==
The IUCN has assessed the white-spotted woodpecker as being of Least Concern. It has a very large range, and though its population size is not known it is believed to be stable. No immediate threats have been identified. It is considered common to locally very common and occurs in several national parks. "Fairly adaptable, able to use a variety of wooded habitats."
