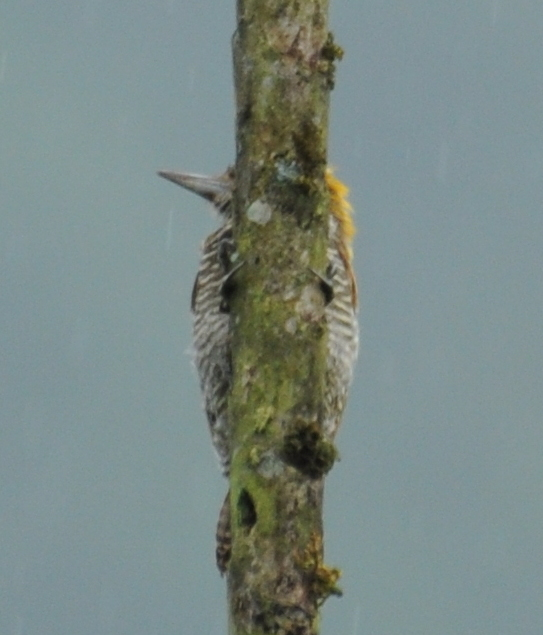

Conservation status
- Near Threatened (IUCN 3.1)

Scientific classification
- Kingdom: Animalia
- Phylum: Chordata
- Class: Aves
- Order: Piciformes
- Family: Picidae
- Genus: Veniliornis
- Species: V. chocoensis

Binomial name
- Veniliornis chocoensis Todd, 1919

Synonyms
- Dryobates chocoensis

= Chocó woodpecker =

Species of bird

The Choco woodpecker (Veniliornis chocoensis) is a near threatened species of bird in subfamily Picinae of the woodpecker family Picidae. It is found in Colombia and Ecuador.

== Taxonomy and systematics ==
The International Ornithological Committee and BirdLife International's Handbook of the Birds of the World place the Choco woodpecker in genus Veniliornis. However, starting in 2018, the American Ornithological Society and the Clements taxonomy moved all species of genus Veniliornis into genus Dryobates. All of these systems use the English name "Choco" rather than "Chocó".

The Choco woodpecker has in the past been treated as a subspecies of both the golden-collared woodpecker (V. (or D.) cassini) and then the red-stained woodpecker (V. (or D.) affinis). Since the late 1900s it has progressively been accepted as a species by major taxonomic systems.

The Choco woodpecker is monotypic.

== Description ==
The Choco woodpecker is 15 to 16 cm (5.9 to 6.3 in) long and weighs about 30 g (1.1 oz). Males and females have the same plumage except on their heads. Males have a red crown with black feather bases that show through. The female has a dark olive-brown crown. Adults of both sexes have a mostly brownish buff face with darker streaks and a dull golden nape and hindneck. Their upperparts are mostly bronzy golden-green with some red wash, pale yellow streaks, and olive and yellowish barring on the rump and uppertail coverts. Their flight feathers are dark brown with olive-yellow edges and buffish bars. Their tail is dark brown with yellowish bars on most feathers. Their underparts are barred with olive and whitish buff. The iris is red-brown to brown, the shortish beak dark with a paler mandible, and the legs are dark olive with a green or gray tinge. Juveniles resemble adults with a streakier face; both sexes have some red on the crown, the male more than the female.

== Distribution and habitat ==
The Choco woodpecker is found in the Chocó Biogeographic Region from Colombia's Antioquia Department south to Pichincha Province in Ecuador. It inhabits the interior and edges of humid to very wet forest, up to an elevation of 1,000 m (3,300 ft) but usually below 700 m (2,300 ft).

== Behavior ==
=== Movement ===
The Choco woodpecker is believed to be a year-round resident throughout its range.

=== Feeding ===
Almost nothing is known about the Choco woodpecker's feeding behavior, but a pair was observed with a mixed species foraging flock in primary forest. Details of its diet are not known but are assumed to be similar to those of the red-stained woodpecker (which see here).

=== Breeding ===
Nothing is known about the Choco woodpecker's breeding biology.

=== Vocalization ===
The Choco woodpecker's vocalizations include sharp pik notes, softer quip notes, wicka-wicka notes, and a gentle rattle.

== Status ==
The IUCN has assessed the Choco woodpecker as Near Threatened. It has a somewhat limited range and an unknown population size that is believed to be decreasing. "Currently [1995], intensive logging, human settlement, cattle-grazing, mining and coca and palm cultivation pose threats, with deforestation most severe in its altitudinal range." It "seems to be rare throughout its small range" but does occur in a few protected areas. "Without appropriate measures to conserve its habitats, this species' conservation status could become Vulnerable."
