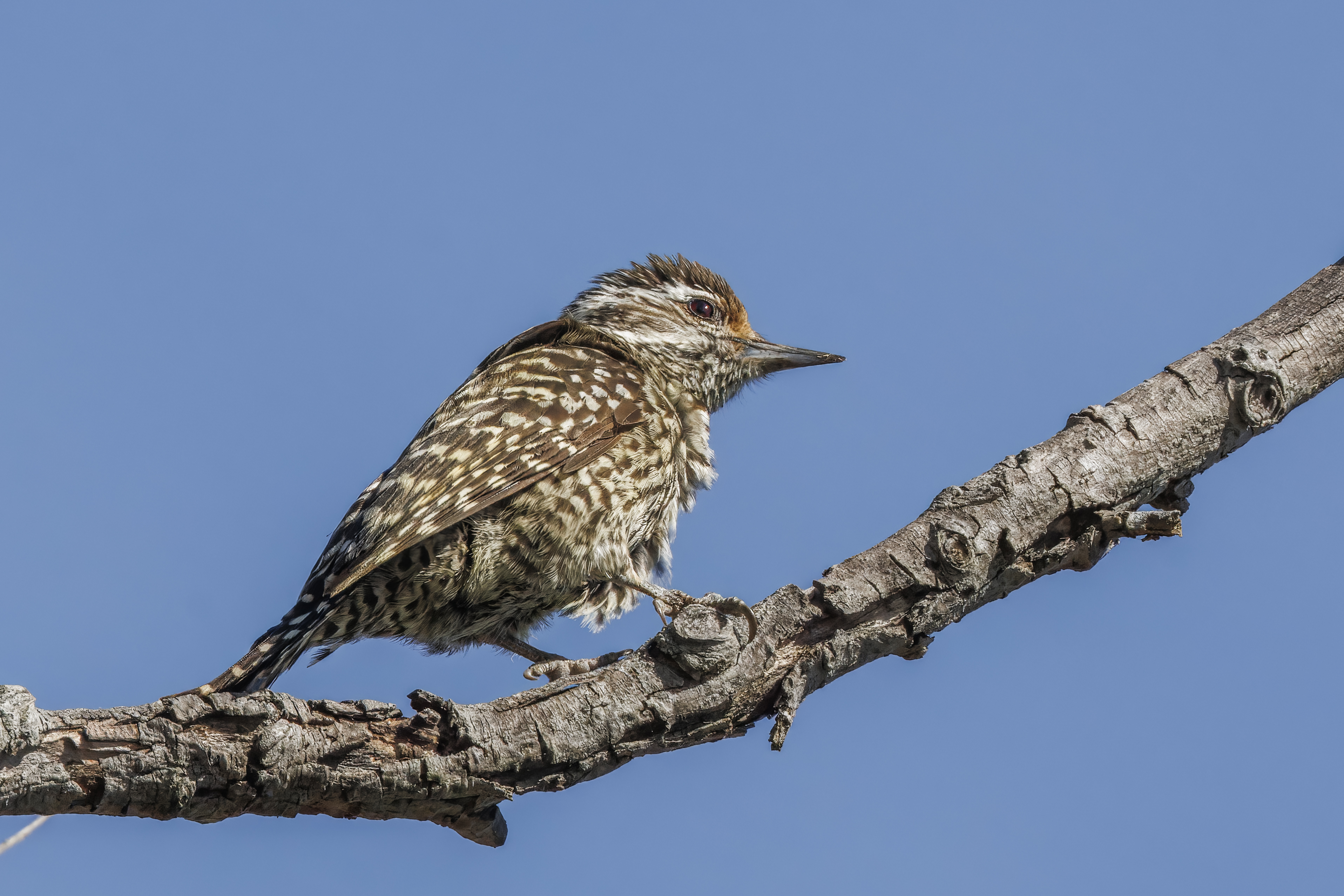
- Female in Colonia, Uruguay

Conservation status
- Least Concern (IUCN 3.1)

Scientific classification
- Kingdom: Animalia
- Phylum: Chordata
- Class: Aves
- Order: Piciformes
- Family: Picidae
- Genus: Veniliornis
- Species: V. mixtus

Binomial name
- Veniliornis mixtus (Boddaert, 1783)

Synonyms
- Dyctiopicus mixtus; Dendrocopos mixtus; Picoides mixtus

= Checkered woodpecker =

Species of bird

The checkered woodpecker (Veniliornis mixtus) is a species of bird in subfamily Picinae of the woodpecker family Picidae. It is found in Argentina, Bolivia, Brazil, Paraguay, and Uruguay.

== Taxonomy and systematics ==
The checkered woodpecker was described by the French polymath Georges-Louis Leclerc, Comte de Buffon in 1780 in his Histoire Naturelle des Oiseaux from a specimen collected in Buenos Aires, Argentina. The bird was also illustrated in a hand-colored plate engraved by François-Nicolas Martinet in the Planches Enluminées D'Histoire Naturelle which was produced under the supervision of Edme-Louis Daubenton to accompany Buffon's text. Neither the plate caption nor Buffon's description included a scientific name but in 1783 the Dutch naturalist Pieter Boddaert coined the binomial name Picus mixtus in his catalogue of the Planches Enluminées.

The checkered woodpecker was at one time placed in genus Dyctiopicus, which was merged into Dendrocopos, which in turn was merged into Picoides where it and its sister species the striped woodpecker (V. lignarius) were considered outliers. In 2006, Moore et al. published research on mtDNA COI and Cyt b sequences which suggested that the two belong in genus Veniliornis. That treatment is now (2023) followed by the International Ornithological Committee and BirdLife International's Handbook of the Birds of the World. However, starting in 2018, the American Ornithological Society and the Clements taxonomy moved all species of genus Veniliornis into genus Dryobates. In addition, there have been suggestions that the striped and checkered woodpeckers are conspecific.

The genus Veniliornis was introduced by the French ornithologist Charles Lucien Bonaparte in 1854. The generic name combines the name of the Roman deity Venilia with the Ancient Greek word ornis meaning "bird". The specific epithet mixtus is the Latin word for "mixed" or "jumbled".

The above taxonomic systems recognize four subspecies:

- V. m. cancellatus (Wagler, 1829)
- V. m. mixtus (Boddaert, 1783)
- V. m. malleator (Wetmore, 1922)
- V. m. berlepschi (Hellmayr, 1915)

Subspecies V. m. cancellatus was at one time treated as a separate species.

== Description ==
The checkered woodpecker is about 14 cm (5.5 in) long and weighs 30 to 37 g (1.1 to 1.3 oz). Males and females have the same plumage except on their heads. Adults of both sexes of the nominate subspecies V. m. mixtus have a blackish-brown forehead and crown, a blackish-brown hindneck, and a generally white face with a dark brown stripe back from the eye and a thin dark brown malar stripe. Males have some white or buffish white streaks on the crown and a red or orange-red nape. The female's nape is black where the male's is red and its crown is solid black. Both sexes' upperparts are blackish-brown, with whitish or brownish-white bars. Their flight feathers are deep brown with white bars. Their tail is brownish-black with narrow white bars. Their underparts are white with a yellow or buff tinge, and dark brown streaks on the breast and belly, brown bars on the flanks, and thin brown streaks on the undertail coverts. Juveniles are duller and darker than adults, with broken bars on their upperparts and heavy streaks and bars on their dull white underparts. Both sexes have red on the crown (not the nape), though the female's patch is smaller.

Subspecies V. m. berlepschi is similar to the nominate, but its brown parts are somewhat darker, the patch behind the eye is larger, and its underparts are a purer white. V. m. malleator is similar to berlepschi but with heavier streaking on the underparts. V. m. cancellatus is distinctive. It is much browner than the nominate, especially where the nominate is black like on the crown. The white bars on its upperparts are much wider than the brown ones and its underparts have much more white with fewer and smaller streaks than the nominate's. The subspecies intergrade; "malleator and berlepschi may be more appropriately lumped into [the] nominate."

== Distribution and habitat ==
The subspecies of checkered woodpecker are found thus:

- V. m. cancellatus (Wagler, 1829), from extreme eastern Bolivia into eastern and southern Brazil.
- V. m. mixtus (Boddaert, 1783), eastern Argentina, extreme southeastern Brazil, and western Uruguay
- V. m. malleator (Wetmore, 1922), the Chaco Basin of southeastern Bolivia, western Paraguay, and northern Argentina
- V. m. berlepschi (Hellmayr, 1915), central and eastern Argentina

The checkered woodpecker primarily inhabits humid open woodlands and gallery forest, but also occurs in savanna and cerrado woodlands. Subspecies V. m. berlepschi inhabits arid bushlands characterized by Prosopis mesquite. In elevation the species ranges from near sea level to about 600 m (2,000 ft).

Subspecific differences run contrary to Gloger's rule. V. m. malleator and V. m. berlepschi, which inhabit more arid habitat, have darker and more prominent underside patterning, whereas the other two subspecies which are birds of mesic or riparian woodland are paler overall.

== Behavior ==
=== Movement ===
Checkered woodpeckers in parts of the Brazilian state of Mato Grosso are there only between January and May, but nothing else is known about their movements or those of other populations.

=== Feeding ===
Checkered woodpeckers forage singly and in pairs, usually on small branches of bushes and trees. They mostly find their diet of insects and seeds by gleaning and probing.

=== Breeding ===
The checkered woodpecker's breeding season is from September to November. Both sexes excavate the nest hole, typically 3 to 6 m (10 to 20 ft) above ground in a tree or palm. The clutch size is four eggs. The incubation period, time to fledging, and details of parental care are not known.

=== Vocal and non-vocal sounds ===
The checkered woodpecker makes a "peek" and a "we-we-we..."; it trills "ti-ti-ti-ti-ti..." for long-distance contact. It also drums.

== Status ==
The IUCN has assessed the checkered woodpecker as being of Least Concern. It has a very large range, and though its population size is not known it is believed to be stable. No immediate threats have been identified. It occurs in several protected areas and is "[p]robably quite common, but appears to be very local, for reasons not understood."
