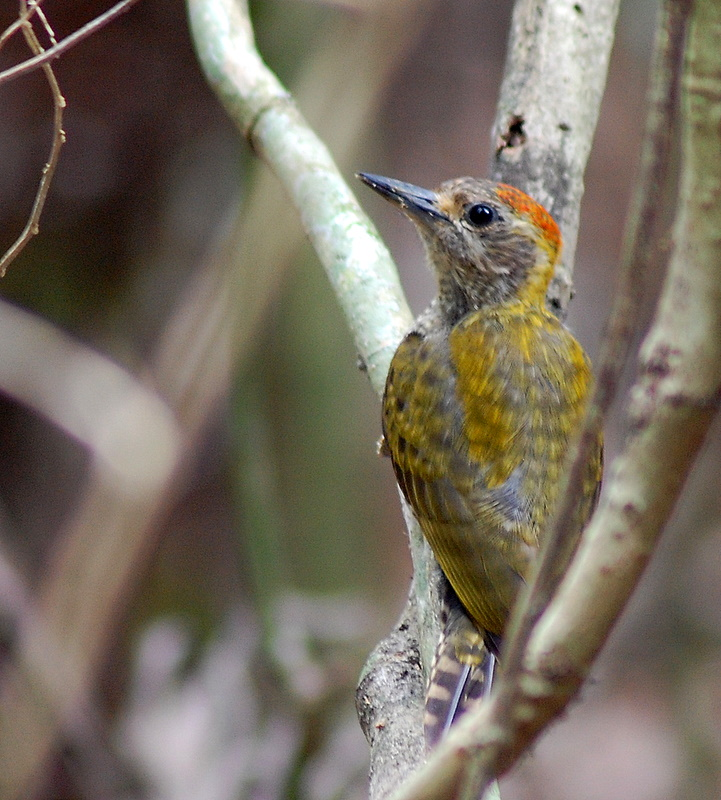
- A male photographed on Ilha Grande, Rio de Janeiro, Brazil.

Conservation status
- Least Concern (IUCN 3.1)

Scientific classification
- Kingdom: Animalia
- Phylum: Chordata
- Class: Aves
- Order: Piciformes
- Family: Picidae
- Genus: Veniliornis
- Species: V. maculifrons

Binomial name
- Veniliornis maculifrons (Spix, 1824)

Synonyms
- Dryobates maculifrons

= Yellow-eared woodpecker =

Species of bird

The yellow-eared woodpecker (Veniliornis maculifrons) is a species of bird in subfamily Picinae of the woodpecker family Picidae. It is endemic to eastern Brazil.

== Taxonomy and systematics ==
The International Ornithological Committee and BirdLife International's Handbook of the Birds of the World place the yellow-eared woodpecker in genus Veniliornis. However, starting in 2018, the American Ornithological Society and the Clements taxonomy moved all species of genus Veniliornis into genus Dryobates.

The yellow-eared woodpecker is monotypic.

== Description ==
The yellow-eared woodpecker is about 15 cm (5.9 in) long. Males and females have the same plumage except on their heads. Males have a brown crown with white streaks and some red tips and a mostly red hindcrown. The female has an olive crown with pale spots, and golden tips on feathers in the rear. Adults of both sexes have a mostly olive-brown face with whitish streaks and a pale golden-yellow nape. Their upperparts are mostly yellowish green, sometimes with a bronzy tinge, and yellowish spots and bars especially on the rump. Their flight feathers are darkish brown with pale yellow to white bars. Their tail is dark brown with paler bars on most feathers. Their underparts are off-white with narrow olive bars that are wider on the breast and flanks. The iris is dark brown to reddish, the long beak blackish with a paler base, and the legs are olive or gray. Juveniles are duller than adults and have heavier barring on their upperparts and coarser barring on their underparts.

== Distribution and habitat ==
The yellow-eared woodpecker is found in eastern Brazil between the states of Bahia and Rio de Janeiro. It inhabits lowlands and hills of the Atlantic Forest, both primary and secondary, and is also found in parks.

== Behavior ==
=== Movement ===
The yellow-eared woodpecker is believed to be a year-round resident throughout its range.

=== Feeding ===
The yellow-eared woodpecker has been documented feeding on insect larvae and pecking on an avocado (Persea americana), but nothing else is known about its diet or foraging strategy.

=== Breeding ===
The yellow-eared woodpecker's breeding season appears to include at least March to July. One nest hole was about 18 m (60 ft) up in a tree. Nothing else is known about the species' breeding biology.

=== Vocalization ===
The yellow-eared woodpecker's vocalization is a "high, nasal, rising then slightly falling, chattering rattle" that lasts about five to seven seconds.

== Status ==
The IUCN has assessed the yellow-eared woodpecker as being of Least Concern. Though it has a somewhat limited range and an unknown population size, the latter is believed to be stable. No immediate threats have been identified. It is not a well-known species. "Attempts to determine and subsequently monitor this species' population in this unique Brazilian habitat would appear to be desirable."
