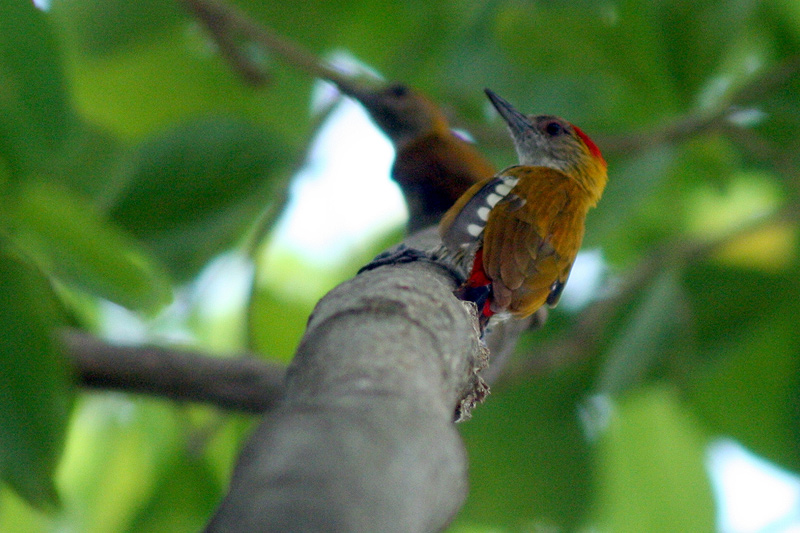

Conservation status
- Least Concern (IUCN 3.1)

Scientific classification
- Kingdom: Animalia
- Phylum: Chordata
- Class: Aves
- Order: Piciformes
- Family: Picidae
- Genus: Veniliornis
- Species: V. kirkii

Binomial name
- Veniliornis kirkii (Malherbe, 1845)

Synonyms
- Dryobates kirkii

= Red-rumped woodpecker =

Species of bird

The red-rumped woodpecker (Veniliornis kirkii) is a species of bird in the subfamily Picinae of the woodpecker family Picidae. It is found from Costa Rica south to Peru and east to Brazil, Guyana, and Trinidad and Tobago.

== Taxonomy and systematics ==
The International Ornithological Committee and BirdLife International's Handbook of the Birds of the World place the red-rumped woodpecker in the genus Veniliornis. However, starting in 2018, the American Ornithological Society and the Clements taxonomy moved all species of the genus Veniliornis into genus Dryobates.

The taxonomic systems agree that the red-rumped woodpecker has these five subspecies:

- V. (or D.) k. neglectus Bangs, 1901
- V. (or D.) k. cecilii (Malherbe, 1849)
- V. (or D.) k. continentalis Hellmayr, 1906
- V. (or D.) k. monticola Hellmayr, 1918
- V. (or D.) k. kirkii (Malherbe, 1845)

== Description ==
The red-rumped woodpecker is about 15 to 16 cm (5.9 to 6.3 in) long and weighs 30 to 42 g (1.1 to 1.5 oz). Males and females have the same plumage except on their heads. Males of the nominate subspecies kirkii have a red crown and nape with some dusky brown or dark gray feather tips. The female has a dark brown crown with a tinge of green. Adults of both sexes have mostly olive-brown faces with whitish streaks. Their upperparts are mostly golden olive-brown with some yellow and red feather tips and crimson-red rump and uppertail coverts. Their flight feathers are dark brown with greenish-olive edges. Also, their tails are dark brown with pale buff bars on the outer pairs of feathers. Furthermore, their underparts are barred with dark brown and whitish, with the whitish ones wider on the belly. The iris is dark brown to red-brown, the longish beak blackish with a paler mandible, and the legs are grayish with a green to blue tinge. Juveniles resemble adults except that both sexes have some red on the crown, the male more than the female.

Subspecies monticola is larger than the nominate and has heavy blackish barring on its underparts. Subspecies continentalis is smaller than the nominate, has more yellow on its nape, and wider pale bars on its underparts. Subspecies cecilii is smaller than continentalis, and compared to the nominate has less pattern on the chin and throat and more barring on the tail. Subspecies neglectus is brighter above and darker below than the nominate.

== Distribution and habitat ==
The subspecies of the red-rumped woodpecker are found thus:

- V. (or D.) k. neglectus, southern Costa Rica and western Panama including Coiba Island
- V. (or D.) k. cecilii, from eastern Panama south through western Colombia and western Ecuador into extreme northwestern Peru
- V. (or D.) k. continentalis, western and northern Venezuela
- V. (or D.) k. monticola, the tepui area where central and southeastern Venezuela, western Guyana, and extreme northwestern Brazil meet
- V. (or D.) k. kirkii, northeastern Venezuela's Paria Peninsula, Trinidad, and Tobago

The red-rumped woodpecker inhabits a wide variety of mostly relatively open lowland and foothill landscapes. These include wet forests, secondary forests, the edges of mangroves, gallery forests, dry scrublands, deciduous forests, savannas with scattered trees, and coconut plantations. In elevation, it reaches 900 m (3,000 ft) in Panama, 1,000 m (3,300 ft) in western Venezuela, 1,200 m (3,900 ft) in Ecuador, 1,500 m (4,900 ft) in Peru, and 1,750 m (5,700 ft) in the tepui region.

== Behavior ==
=== Movement ===
The red-rumped woodpecker is a year-round resident throughout its range.

=== Feeding ===
The red-rumped woodpecker primarily forages from the forest's mid-level to the canopy but will come lower at the edges. It hunts by pecking and steady hammering, on smallish branches to trunks, and often in thick growth. It usually forages singly, in pairs, or small groups, but will join mixed-species feeding flocks. Its diet includes adults and larvae of wood-boring beetles and other insects.

=== Breeding ===
The red-rumped woodpecker's breeding season varies geographically, for instance between December and February or March in Panama, February to March in northern Venezuela, and apparently at least July to September in Ecuador. It excavates a nest cavity in a living tree or palm, typically between 3 and 8 m (10 and 25 ft) above the ground. The clutch size is two or three eggs. The incubation period, time to fledging, and details of parental care are not known.

=== Vocal and non-vocal sounds ===
The red-rumped woodpecker's most frequent vocalization is "a rather slow series of nasal and emphatic calls, 'kénh kenh kenh kenh'." It also makes a nasal "keer", "mewing 'wih' or 'kwee' in...ventriloquial series", and a "repeated 'kee-yik kee-yik'." Its drumming is "rapid, noisy, [and] often prolonged".

== Status ==
The IUCN has assessed the red-rumped woodpecker as being of Least Concern. It has an extremely large range and an estimated population of at least a half million mature individuals. The latter, however, is believed to be decreasing. No immediate threats have been identified. It occurs in several national parks and preserves and is considered uncommon to fairly common in different parts of its range. "Generally inconspicuous, possibly overlooked, but presence often revealed by the sound of its frequent pecking and hammering."
