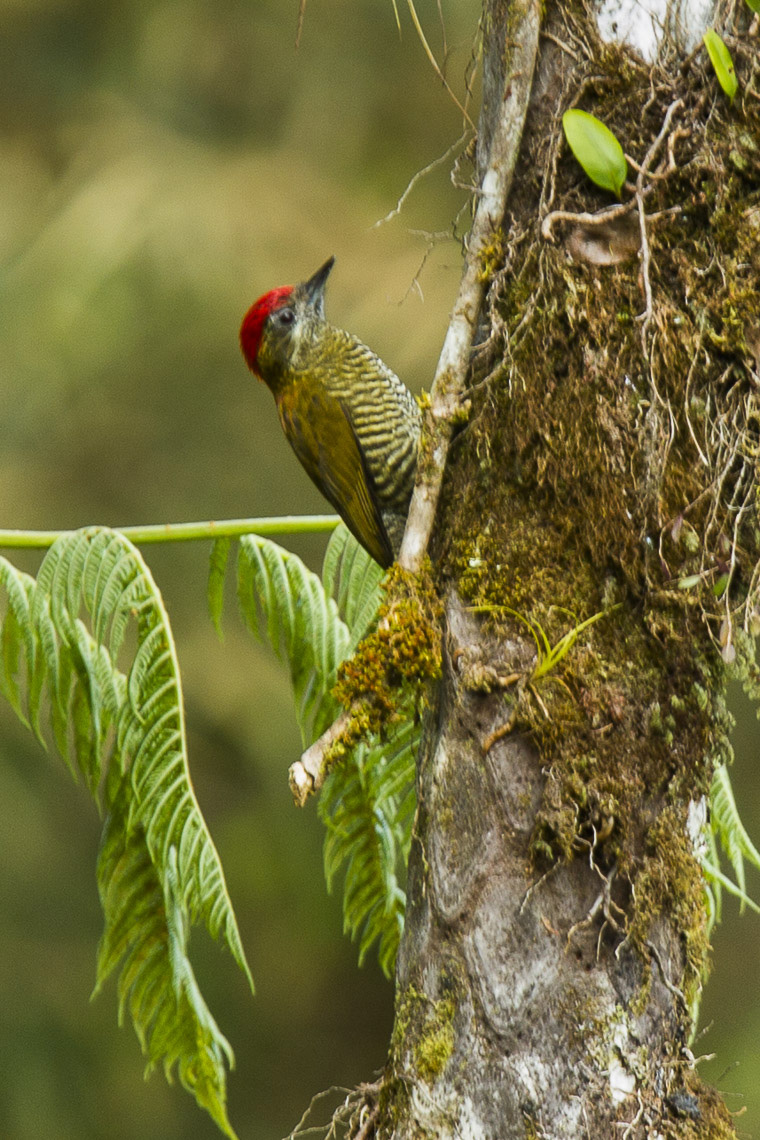

Conservation status
- Least Concern (IUCN 3.1)

Scientific classification
- Kingdom: Animalia
- Phylum: Chordata
- Class: Aves
- Order: Piciformes
- Family: Picidae
- Genus: Veniliornis
- Species: V. nigriceps

Binomial name
- Veniliornis nigriceps (D'Orbigny, 1840)

Synonyms
- Dryobates nigriceps

= Bar-bellied woodpecker =

Species of bird

The bar-bellied woodpecker (Veniliornis nigriceps) is a species of bird in subfamily Picinae of the woodpecker family Picidae. It is found in Bolivia, Colombia, Ecuador, and Peru.

== Taxonomy and systematics ==
The International Ornithological Committee and BirdLife International's Handbook of the Birds of the World place the bar-bellied woodpecker in genus Veniliornis. However, starting in 2018, the American Ornithological Society and the Clements taxonomy moved all species of genus Veniliornis into genus Dryobates.

The above taxonomic systems recognize three subspecies, the nominate nigriceps (D'Orbigny, 1840), equifasciatus (Chapman, 1912), and pectoralis (Berlepsch & Stolzmann, 1902).

== Description ==
The bar-bellied woodpecker is 17 to 20 cm (6.7 to 7.9 in) long and weighs 39 to 46 g (1.4 to 1.6 oz). Males and females have the same plumage except on their heads. Adults of both sexes of the nominate subspecies have a mostly dark olive-brown face with thin white stripes behind and below the eye. Males are red from forehead to nape with black feather bases showing through. The female has a black crown and a golden nape. Both sexes' mantle and back are dark olive with a bronze tinge and faint paler bars on their rump and uppertail coverts. Their flight feathers are olive-brown with bronze-olive tips. Their tail is blackish; the outer two pairs of feathers have paler bars. Their underparts are buffish white with an olive tinge and wide dark olive bars throughout. The iris is deep red to brown, the longish beak gray to blue-gray with a lighter mandible, and the legs are gray to olive-gray. Juveniles are generally duller and greener than adults with more barring on the tail. Both sexes have some red on their crown, with the male having more.

Subspecies equifasciatus' light and dark bars on the underparts are of roughly equal width; the female's crown is blackish with an olive tinge. Subspecies pectoralis is much like the nominate but has somewhat darker underparts with very narrow pale bars.

== Distribution and habitat ==
The bar-bellied woodpecker's subspecies equifasciatus is the northernmost; it is found from Colombia's central Andes south through Ecuador and into northern Peru's Amazonas Department. Subspecies pectoralis is found on the eastern slope of the Peruvian Andes from Amazonas to Junín Department. The nominate subspecies is found on the east slope of the Andes from Junín in Peru to central Bolivia's Cochabamba and Santa Cruz departments.

The bar-bellied woodpecker inhabits humid to wet montane forest and above it elfin forest and occasionally even higher Polylepis woodland. It favors landscapes with dense undergrowth, especially of Chusquea bamboo. In elevation it mostly occurs between 2,600 and 3,600 m (8,500 and 11,800 ft) but is found as low as 2,000 m (6,600 ft) and in Ecuador as high as 4,000 m (13,000 ft).

== Behavior ==
=== Movement ===
The bar-bellied woodpecker is a year-round resident throughout its range; no elevational movements have been recorded.

=== Feeding ===
The bar-bellied woodpecker forages at all levels of the forest though it spends much time in dense undergrowth. It is usually single, sometimes in pairs, and regularly joins mixed species foraging flocks. It pecks and flakes bark and probes among patches of moss. No details of its diet are known.

=== Breeding ===
The bar-bellied woodpecker breeds in February and March in Ecuador and in April and May in Bolivia; its season in Peru includes August. Nothing else is known about its breeding biology.

=== Vocalization ===
The bar-bellied woodpecker sings infrequently, "up to c. 25 high-pitched 'kee' notes, rising before dropping". It also makes "soft 'chik', and high descending 'kzzrr'" notes.

== Status ==
The IUCN has assessed the bar-bellied woodpecker as being of Least Concern. It has a large range, and though its population size is not known it is believed to be stable. No immediate threats have been identified. It is considered from rare to uncommon in different parts of its range. It occurs in several protected areas. "Possibly overlooked owing to its unobtrusive habits, but likely to occur at very low densities".
