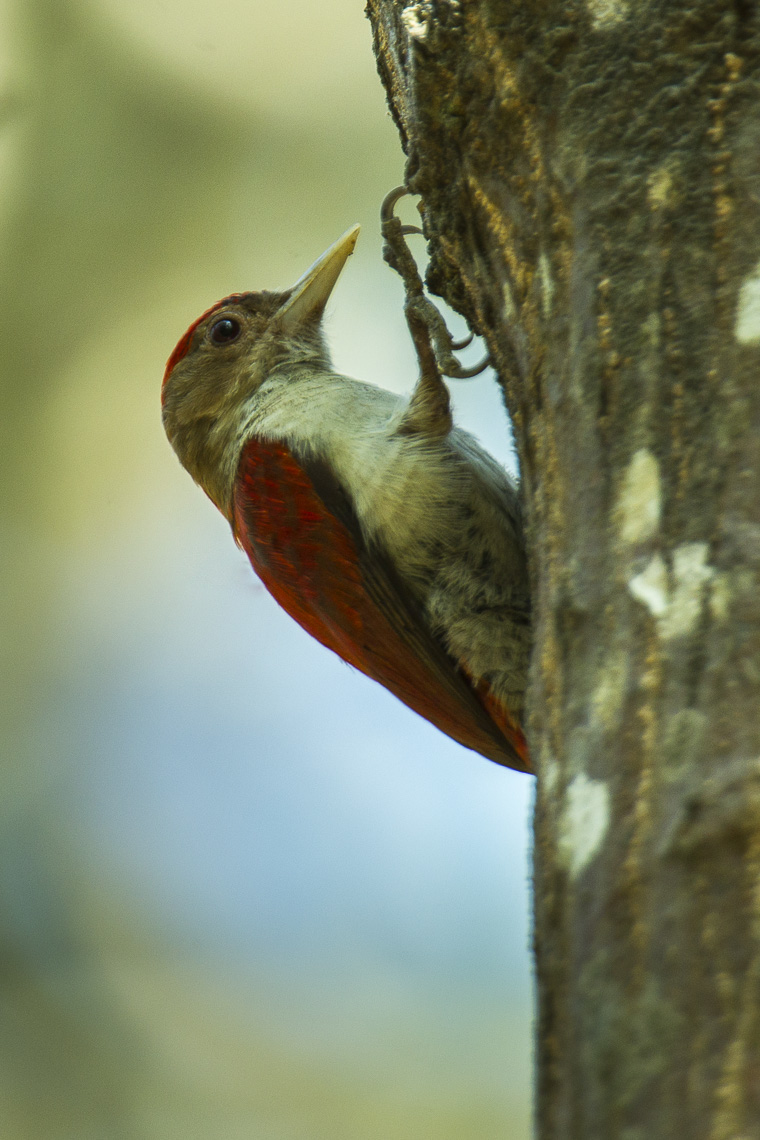

Conservation status
- Least Concern (IUCN 3.1)

Scientific classification
- Kingdom: Animalia
- Phylum: Chordata
- Class: Aves
- Order: Piciformes
- Family: Picidae
- Genus: Veniliornis
- Species: V. callonotus

Binomial name
- Veniliornis callonotus (Waterhouse, 1841)

Synonyms
- Dryobates callonotus

= Scarlet-backed woodpecker =

Species of bird

The scarlet-backed woodpecker (Veniliornis callonotus) is a species of bird in subfamily Picinae of the woodpecker family Picidae. It is found in Colombia, Ecuador and Peru.

== Taxonomy and systematics ==
The International Ornithological Committee and BirdLife International's Handbook of the Birds of the World place the scarlet-backed woodpecker in genus Veniliornis. However, starting in 2018, the American Ornithological Society and the Clements taxonomy moved all species of genus Veniliornis into genus Dryobates.

The above taxonomic systems recognize two subspecies, the nominate V. c. callonotus and V. c. major (Berlepsch & Taczanowski, 1884):

== Description ==
The scarlet-backed woodpecker is about 13 cm (5.1 in) long and weighs 23 to 33 g (0.81 to 1.2 oz). Males and females have the same plumage except on their heads. Adults of both sexes of the nominate subspecies have a generally grayish brown and white face. Males are red from forehead to nape with black tips on many feathers. The female is entirely black there. Both sexes' upperparts are brownish-scarlet. Their flight feathers are dark brown with redder secondaries and tertials. Their tail is blackish-brown whose central pair of feathers is blacker and the outer pair whitish yellow with black bars. Their underparts are white with a very light buff wash and sometimes darker but faint vermiculation. The iris is deep brown (occasionally deep red), the beak yellowish with darker base and tip, and the legs are greenish gray. Juveniles have heavy olive or grayish mottling on their upperparts and are buffier white on their underparts. Their head pattern is more diffuse than the adults'. Adults of subspecies V. c. major have a darker face and darker vermiculation on the underparts than the nominate.

== Distribution and habitat ==
The nominate subspecies of scarlet-backed woodpecker is found from Colombia's Nariño Department south through western Ecuador to Guayas Province. V. c. major is found from El Oro and Loja provinces in Ecuador south into Peru as far as La Libertad Department. The species inhabits arid scrublands, dry deciduous woodland, semi-humid forest, dense riparian forest, and sometimes partially cleared areas. In elevation it mostly occurs from near sea level to 1,000 m (3,300 ft), less frequently to 1,500 m (4,900 ft) in Peru, and locally as high as 1,800 m (5,900 ft) in Ecuador.

== Behavior ==
=== Movement ===
As far as is known, the scarlet-backed woodpecker is a year-round resident throughout its range.

=== Feeding ===
The scarlet-backed woodpecker forages at all levels of the forest, usually on small branches and thin twigs, and often in pairs. No details of its diet are known.

=== Breeding ===
The scarlet-backed woodpecker's breeding season includes July in Ecuador but essentially nothing else is known about its breeding biology.

=== Vocalization ===
The scarlet-backed woodpecker's most common call is "a rattle, 1-2 seconds long". It also makes a "sharp 'ki-dik', sometimes in short fast series."

== Status ==
The IUCN has assessed the scarlet-backed woodpecker as being of Least Concern. It has a large range, and though its population size is not known it is believed to be increasing. No immediate threats have been identified. It appears to be very local in Colombia and fairly common in Ecuador and Peru, where it occurs in a few protected areas. In Ecuador it "has spread into more humid areas, presumably as a result of deforestation."
