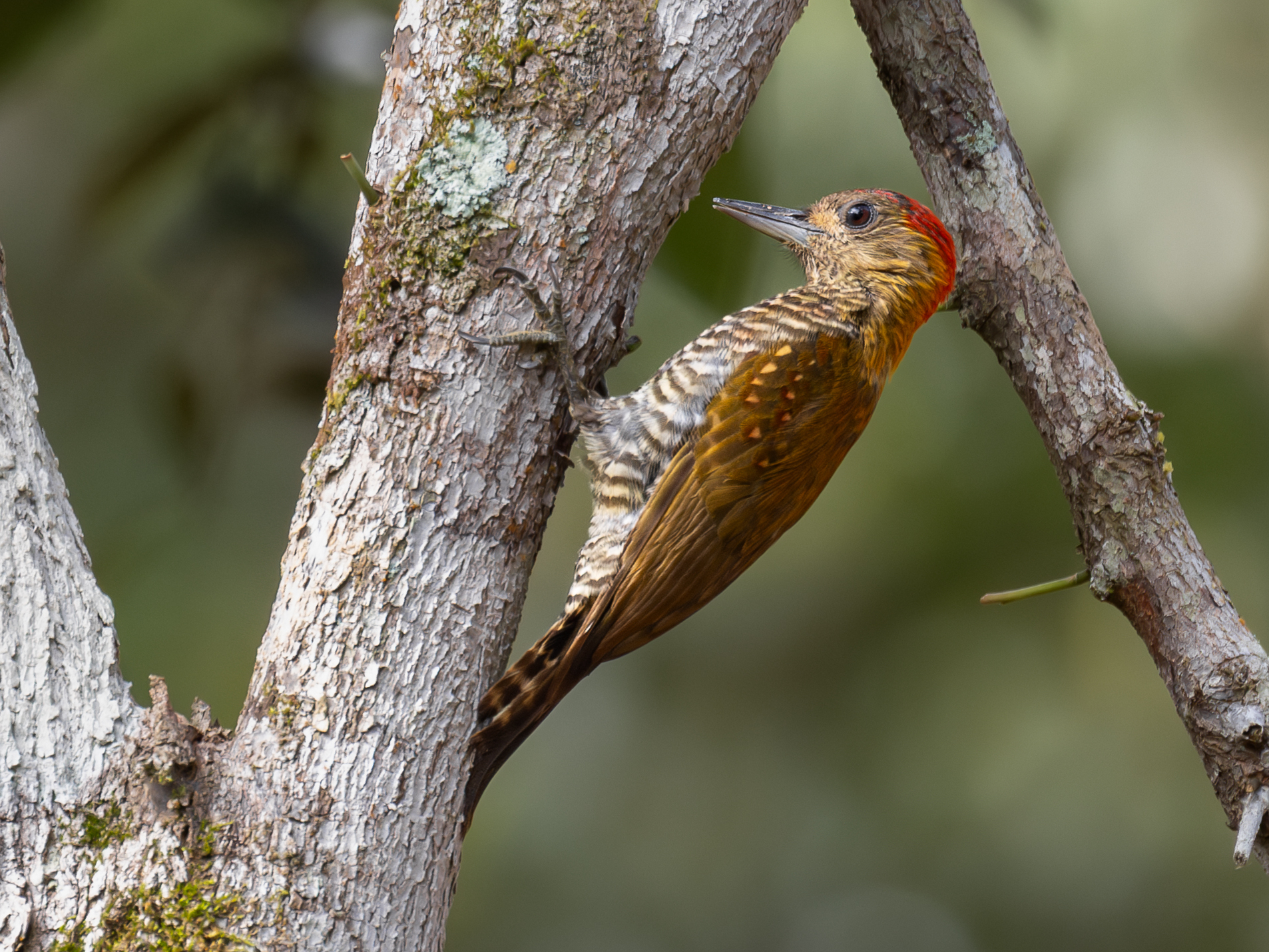
- A male at Porto Seguro, Bahia State, Brazil

Conservation status
- Least Concern (IUCN 3.1)

Scientific classification
- Kingdom: Animalia
- Phylum: Chordata
- Class: Aves
- Order: Piciformes
- Family: Picidae
- Genus: Veniliornis
- Species: V. affinis

Binomial name
- Veniliornis affinis (Swainson, 1821)

Synonyms
- Dryobates affinis

= Red-stained woodpecker =

Species of bird

The red-stained woodpecker (Veniliornis affinis) is a species of bird in subfamily Picinae of the woodpecker family Picidae. It is found in Bolivia, Brazil, Colombia, Ecuador, Peru, and Venezuela.

== Taxonomy and systematics ==
The International Ornithological Committee and BirdLife International's Handbook of the Birds of the World place the red-stained woodpecker in genus Veniliornis. However, starting in 2018, the American Ornithological Society and the Clements taxonomy moved all species of genus Veniliornis into genus Dryobates.

The taxonomic systems agree that the red-stained woodpecker has these four subspecies:

- V. (or D.) a. orenocensis Berlepsch & Hartert, E.J.O., 1902
- V. (or D.) a. hilaris (Cabanis & Heine, 1863)
- V. (or D.) a. ruficeps (Spix, 1824)
- V. (or D.) a. affinis (Swainson, 1821)

Subspecies hilaris and ruficeps have at times been treated as separate species. What is now the Choco woodpecker (V. (or D.) chocoensis) was at one time treated as a subspecies of the red-stained woodpecker.

== Description ==
The red-stained woodpecker is about 15 to 18 cm (5.9 to 7.1 in) long and weighs 32 to 44 g (1.1 to 1.6 oz). Males and females have the same plumage except on their heads. Males of the nominate subspecies affinis have a red crown with black feather bases that show through. The female has a dark olive-brown crown. Adults of both sexes have a mostly buffish face with olive streaks and a golden-yellow nape and hindneck. Their upperparts are mostly yellowish green with some red feather tips, pale yellow streaks, and some barring on the rump and uppertail coverts. Their flight feathers are dark brown with wide green edges and buffish white bars on the primaries and secondaries. Their tail is dark brown with yellowish bars on most feathers. Their underparts are light cinnamon-buff with dark olive-brown bars that are more widely spaced on the belly and flanks. The iris is brown to red-brown, the longish beak blackish with a paler mandible, and the legs are olive green to green-gray. Juveniles resemble adults with a darker and streakier face; both sexes have some red on the crown, the male more than the female.

Subspecies orenocensis has greener upperparts with less red than the nominate. Subspecies hilaris is larger than the nominate, with more bronzy or yellow upperparts with fainter streaks, and with broad red tips on the wing coverts. Subspecies ruficeps is the same size as hilaris, with larger red tips on the cover feathers and more obvious yellow streaks on the upperparts.

== Distribution and habitat ==
The subspecies of red-stained woodpecker are found thus:

- V. (or D.) a. orenocensis, southeastern Colombia and far southern Venezuela into Brazil north of the Amazon as far as the Rio Negro
- V. (or D.) a. hilaris, eastern Ecuador east into western Brazil to the Rio Madeira and south through eastern Peru into northern Bolivia
- V. (or D.) a. ruficeps, central and northeastern Brazil south of the Amazon and east of the Rio Madeira south to Mato Grosso
- V. (or D.) a. affinis, the eastern Brazilian states of Alagoas, Pernambuco, and Bahia

The red-stained woodpecker primarily inhabits the interior of tall rainforest. It occurs less at the forest edges, in secondary forest, and scrublands. In Ecuador and Peru it also occurs in humid lowland terra firme and sometimes várzea forests. It will occasionally forage in more open landscapes. In elevation it occurs between 100 and 500 m (300 and 1,600 ft) in Venezuela, up to 1,000 m (3,300 ft) in Colombia, as high as 850 m (2,800 ft) but usually only to 600 m (2,000 ft) in Ecuador, and up to 1,300 m (4,300 ft) in Peru.

== Behavior ==
=== Movement ===
The red-stained woodpecker is believed to be a year-round resident throughout its range.

=== Feeding ===
The red-stained woodpecker mostly forages from the forest's mid-level to the canopy but will come lower at the edges. It usually forages singly and regularly joins mixed species feeding flocks and follows army ant swarms. It diet includes arthropods and fruit.

=== Breeding ===
The red-stained woodpecker's breeding season is thought to be January to September, but nothing else is known about its breeding biology.

=== Vocalization ===
The red-stained woodpecker is not highly vocal. Its primary vocalization is a "[s]eries of up to c. 10–14 high-pitched nasal 'ghi' or 'kih' notes".

== Status ==
The IUCN has assessed the red-stained woodpecker as being of Least Concern. It has an extremely large range. Its population size is not known but is believed to be stable. No immediate threats have been identified. It occurs in several protected areas. "Very poorly known. Possibly not uncommon but overlooked."
