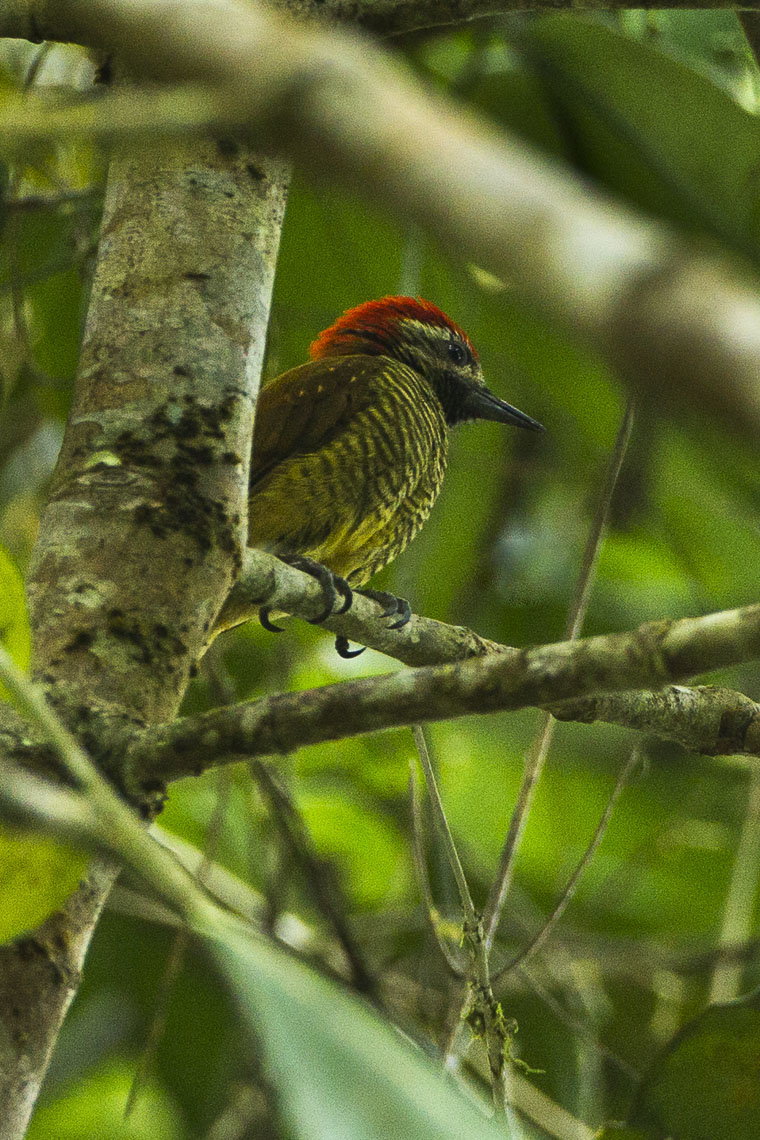

Conservation status
- Least Concern (IUCN 3.1)

Scientific classification
- Kingdom: Animalia
- Phylum: Chordata
- Class: Aves
- Order: Piciformes
- Family: Picidae
- Genus: Veniliornis
- Species: V. dignus

Binomial name
- Veniliornis dignus (Sclater, PL & Salvin, 1877)

Synonyms
- Dryobates dignus

= Yellow-vented woodpecker =

Species of bird

The yellow-vented woodpecker (Veniliornis dignus) is a species of bird in subfamily Picinae of the woodpecker family Picidae. It is found in Colombia, Ecuador, Peru, and Venezuela.

== Taxonomy and systematics ==
The International Ornithological Committee and BirdLife International's Handbook of the Birds of the World place the yellow-vented woodpecker in genus Veniliornis. However, starting in 2018, the American Ornithological Society and the Clements taxonomy moved all species of genus Veniliornis into genus Dryobates.

The above taxonomic systems recognize three subspecies, the nominate dignus (Sclater, PL & Salvin, 1877), baezae (Chapman, 1923), and valdizani (Berlepsch & Stolzmann, 1902).

== Description ==
The yellow-vented woodpecker is 16 to 17 cm (6.3 to 6.7 in) long and weighs 35 to 46 g (1.2 to 1.6 oz). Males and females have the same plumage except on their heads. Adults of both sexes of the nominate subspecies have a mostly blackish olive face with white stripes behind and below the eye. Males are red from forehead to nape with black feather bases showing through. The female is entirely blackish there. Both sexes' mantle and back are yellow-green with a bronze tinge; their rump and uppertail coverts are barred with light and dark olive. Their flight feathers are brownish olive. Their tail is blackish with a yellow cast; the outer two pairs of feathers have pale bars. Their underparts are greenish white becoming yellow in the flanks and belly and with heavy olive-blackish bars from the throat to upper flanks. The iris is brown to red-brown, the medium-long beak blackish with a paler base, and the legs are dark olive-gray. Juveniles are generally duller than adults and have greener upperparts. Both sexes have some red tips on their crown feathers.

Subspecies baezae has a shorter beak than the nominate and its underparts' barring is blacker and extends further onto the flanks. Subspecies valdizani has a longer beak than the nominate and less well defined barring on the rump and uppertail coverts.

== Distribution and habitat ==
The nominate subspecies of yellow-vented woodpecker is found from Táchira in extreme southwestern Venezuela south through the Colombian Andes into the Pacific slope of northern Ecuador's Andes. Subspecies baezae is found on the eastern slope of the Andes in Ecuador. Subspecies valdizani is found on the eastern slope of the Andes in Peru. The species inhabits humid montane forest, in particular cloudforest, and is seldom found outside mature primary forest. In elevation it mostly ranges between 1,200 and 2,700 m (3,900 and 8,900 ft) but is found as low as 700 m (2,300 ft) in Peru.

== Behavior ==
=== Movement ===
The yellow-vented woodpecker is a year-round resident throughout its range.

=== Feeding ===
The yellow-vented woodpecker forages from the forest's middle strata to the canopy. It is usually single or in pairs but occasionally joins mixed species foraging flocks. It often spends a long time at one spot, hammering on a tree trunk or branch. No details of its diet are known.

=== Breeding ===
The yellow-vented woodpecker's breeding season appears to be between March and August, but nothing more is known about its breeding biology.

=== Vocalization ===
The yellow-vented woodpecker is not very vocal, but does make "a fast, rattled 'krrrrrrrrrrrrrrr'."

== Status ==
The IUCN has assessed the yellow-vented woodpecker as being of Least Concern. It has a large range, and though its population size is not known it is believed to be stable. No immediate threats have been identified. It is considered rare in Peru and uncommon in the rest of its range, and "[p]ossibly quite widespread but at very low densities."
