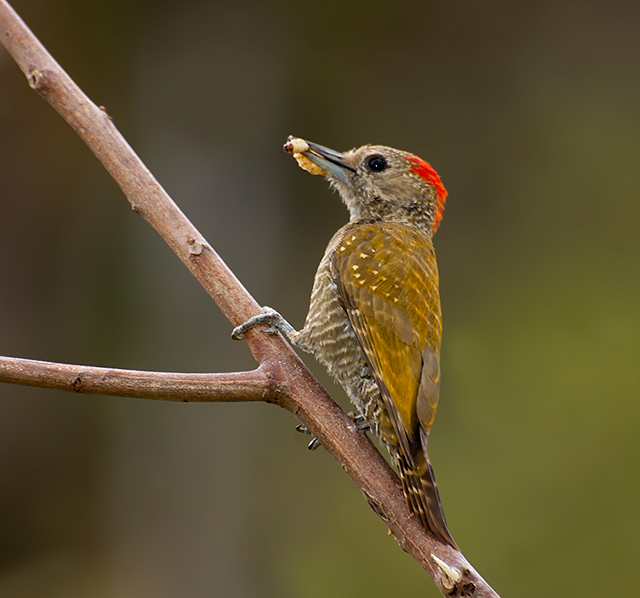

Conservation status
- Least Concern (IUCN 3.1)

Scientific classification
- Kingdom: Animalia
- Phylum: Chordata
- Class: Aves
- Order: Piciformes
- Family: Picidae
- Genus: Veniliornis
- Species: V. passerinus

Binomial name
- Veniliornis passerinus (Linnaeus, 1766)

Synonyms
- Picus passerinus Linnaeus, 1766; Dryobates passerinus

= Little woodpecker =

Species of bird

The little woodpecker (Veniliornis passerinus) is a species of bird in subfamily Picinae of the woodpecker family Picidae. It is found in every mainland South American country except Chile, Suriname, and Uruguay.

== Taxonomy and systematics ==
In 1760 the French zoologist Mathurin Jacques Brisson included a description of the little woodpecker in his Ornithologie based on a specimen collected in Saint-Domingue (now Haiti). He used the French name Le petit pic de S. Domingue and the Latin name Picus dominicensis minor. Although Brisson coined Latin names, these do not conform to the binomial system and are not recognised by the International Commission on Zoological Nomenclature. When in 1766 the Swedish naturalist Carl Linnaeus updated his Systema Naturae for the twelfth edition he added 240 species that had been previously described by Brisson. One of these was the little woodpecker. Linnaeus included a terse description, coined the binomial name Picus passerinus and cited Brisson's work. Linnaeus mistakenly specified the type location as Dominica. This has been corrected to Cayenne in French Guiana. The specific name passerinus is from Latin and means "sparrow like".

The International Ornithological Committee and BirdLife International's Handbook of the Birds of the World place the little woodpecker in genus Veniliornis. However, starting in 2018, the American Ornithological Society and the Clements taxonomy moved all species of genus Veniliornis into genus Dryobates.

The genus Veniliornis was introduced by the French ornithologist Charles Lucien Bonaparte in 1854.

The taxonomic systems agree that the little woodpecker has these nine subspecies:

- V. (or D.) p. fidelis (Hargitt, 1889)
- V. (or D.) p. modestus Zimmer, J.T., 1942
- V. (or D.) p. diversus Zimmer, J.T., 1942
- V. (or D.) p. agilis (Cabanis & Heine, 1863)
- V. (or D.) p. insignis Zimmer, J.T., 1942
- V. (or D.) p. tapajozensis Gyldenstolpe, 1941
- V. (or D.) p. passerinus (Linnaeus, 1766)
- V. (or D.) p. taenionotus (Reichenbach, 1854)
- V. (or D.) p. olivinus (Natterer & Malherbe, 1845)

Subspecies fidelis, agilis, taenionotus, and olivinus have all at times been treated as individual species.

== Description ==
The little woodpecker is about 14 to 15 cm (5.5 to 5.9 in) long and weighs 24 to 37 g (0.85 to 1.3 oz). Males and females have the same plumage except on their heads. Males of the nominate subspecies passerinus have a red forehead, crown, and nape with dark feather bases showing through. The female is grayish olive-brown with indistinct white spots where the male is red. Adults of both sexes have a mostly dark brownish-olive face with pale barring on the chin and throat. Their upperparts are mostly bronzy olive-green with red feather tips, and pale barring on the rump. Their flight feathers are brown with green edges, and narrowish whitish bars on the primaries and secondaries. Their wing coverts have small pale spots. Their tail is dark brown with thin pale bars on the outer feathers. Their underparts are dark olive narrowly barred with buffish white. The iris is deep brown, the longish beak blackish with a paler mandible, and the legs are dark gray. Juveniles are duller and have less bronzy upperparts and less regular bars on the underparts. Both sexes have some red on the crown, the male more than the female.

The other subspecies have differences from the nominate and each other but tend to intergrade. Subspecies modestus has a white "moustache", obvious spots on the wing coverts, and gray-brown underparts with irregular barring. Subspecies fidelis has a pale supercilium, a large white moustache, large spots on the wing coverts, broken or scallop-shaped underparts barring, and usually no bars on the tail. Subspecies diversus has faint or no facial stripes, very pale thin streaks on the wing coverts, and wide bars on the underparts; the male has red only from the central crown to the hindneck. Subspecies agilis has "well developed" supercilium and moustache lines. Subspecies insignis is the smallest; it has no facial stripes, no wing covert spots, and wide pale stripes on the underparts. The male has red only from the central crown to the hindneck. Subspecies tapajozensis's upperparts have a yellow tinge with some red spots. Subspecies taenionotus has yellower upperparts than tapajozensis with hints of barring, large wing covert spots, and very wide pale bars on the underparts. Subspecies olivinus is the largest. It sometimes has a pale supercilium and moustache; the male has red only on the hindcrown and nape.

== Distribution and habitat ==
The subspecies of little woodpecker are found thus:

- V. (or D.) p. fidelis, eastern Colombia and western Venezuela
- V. (or D.) p. modestus, central and northeastern Venezuela
- V. (or D.) p. diversus, northern Brazil north of the Amazon
- V. (or D.) p. agilis, extreme southern Colombia, eastern Ecuador, eastern Peru, western Brazil, and northern Bolivia
- V. (or D.) p. insignis, west central Brazil south of the Amazon
- V. (or D.) p. tapajozensis, east central Brazil along the lower Amazon
- V. (or D.) p. passerinus, the Guianas and northeastern Brazil (but see below)
- V. (or D.) p. taenionotus, eastern Brazil
- V. (or D.) p. olivinus, southeastern Bolivia, southern Brazil, eastern Paraguay, and northwestern and northeastern Argentina

Regarding the range of passerinus, the IOC and Clements list it in "the Guianas", but the South American Classification Committee of the American Ornithological Society has no records of it in Suriname.

The little woodpecker inhabits a wide variety of landscapes, though it generally shuns forest interiors. It usually stays to the edges of cloudforest, várzea forest, and riparian forest. It occurs in gallery forest with bamboo stands, deciduous woodland, mangroves, secondary forest, wooded savanna, and caatinga. In elevation it ranges from sea level along the Atlantic coast to 850 m (2,800 ft) in Venezuela, to 1,200 m (3,900 ft) in Colombia, to 1,300 m (4,300 ft) but usually below 700 m (2,300 ft) in Ecuador, to 900 m (3,000 ft) in Peru, and to 400 m (1,300 ft) in the southern part of its range.

== Behavior ==
=== Movement ===
The little woodpecker is a year-round resident throughout its range.

=== Feeding ===
The little woodpecker forages at all levels of the forest, from the undergrowth to the canopy; it is partial to bamboo. It feeds singly, in pairs, in small groups, and as a member of mixed species foraging flocks. It vigorously pecks and hammers on trunks and branches and bamboo nodes. Its diet includes a wide variety of adult and larval insects including ants, termites, and beetles.

=== Breeding ===
The little woodpecker's nesting season varies geographically, from September–December in French Guiana to October–March in Argentina. The male alone is believed to excavate the nest hole; it is typically 5 to 13 m (15 to 45 ft) above the ground in a stub, palm, or bamboo. The typical clutch size, incubation period, and time to fledging are not known. Both parents provision nestlings.

=== Vocal and non-vocal sounds ===
What is believed to be the little woodpecker's long-distance call is a "[h]igh-pitched 'ki, ki, ki, ki' or 'wi-wi-wi-wi-wi-wi-wi'." It also makes "wicka" or "wik-wik-wik" calls. The species drums.

== Status ==
The IUCN has assessed the little woodpecker as being of Least Concern. It has an extremely large range, and though its population size is not known it is believed to be stable. No immediate threats have been identified. It is "generally...not uncommon" and is an "adaptable species, able to exploit a variety of wooded habitats."
