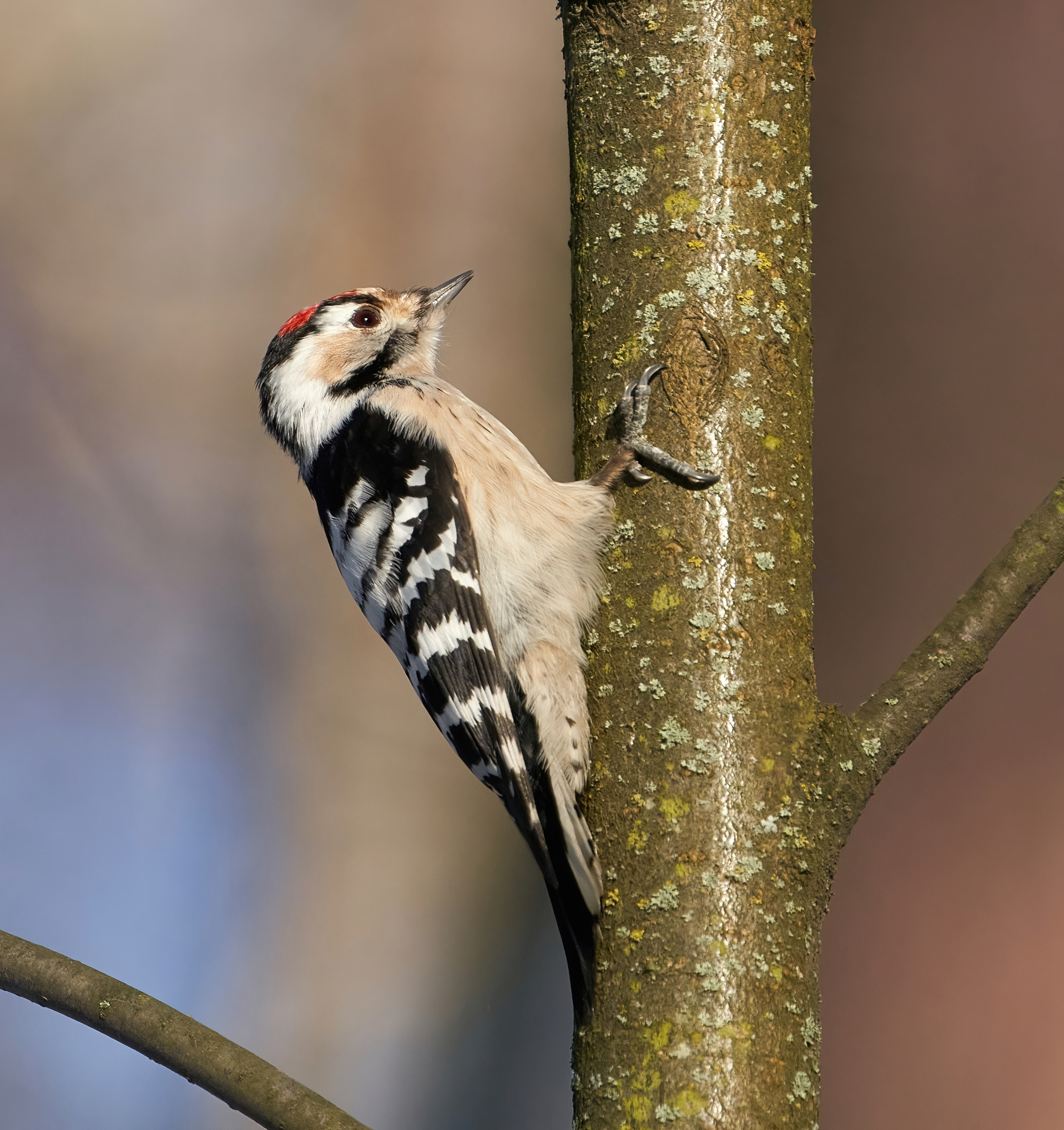
- Male D. m. minor, St. Petersburg Oblast, Russia
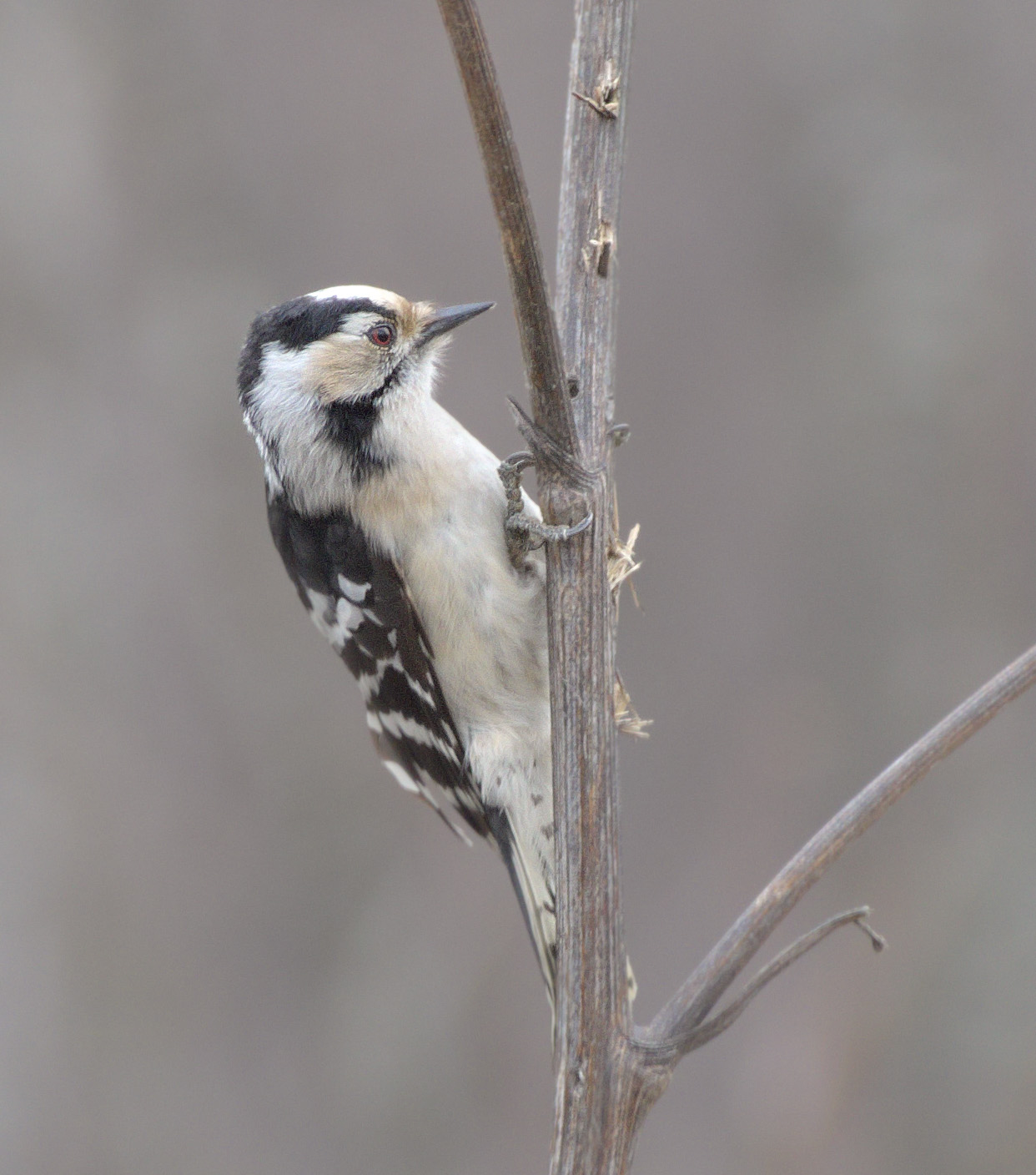
- Female D. m. minor, near Moscow, Russia

Conservation status
- Least Concern (IUCN 3.1)

Scientific classification
- Kingdom: Animalia
- Phylum: Chordata
- Class: Aves
- Order: Piciformes
- Family: Picidae
- Genus: Dryobates
- Species: D. minor

Binomial name
- Dryobates minor (Linnaeus, 1758)
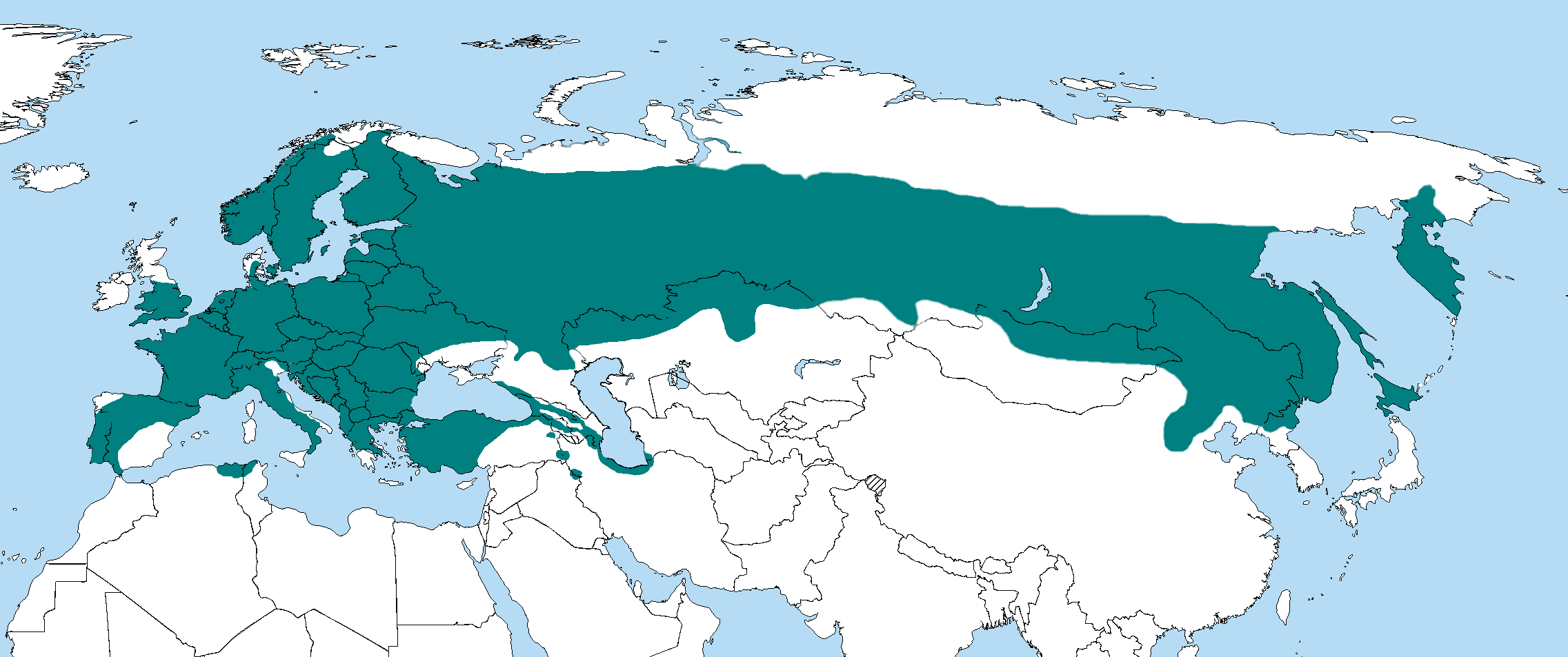
- Range of D. minor

Synonyms
- Picus minor Linnaeus, 1758; Dendrocopos minor Linnaeus, 1758

= Lesser spotted woodpecker =

Species of bird

The lesser spotted woodpecker (Dryobates minor) is a member of the woodpecker family Picidae. It was formerly assigned to the genus Dendrocopos (sometimes incorrectly spelt as Dendrocopus). Some taxonomic authorities continue to list the species there.

The range of the lesser spotted woodpecker is the Palearctic region, but several subspecies are recognised.

== Taxonomy ==
The lesser spotted woodpecker was listed by the Swedish naturalist Carl Linnaeus in 1758 in the 10th edition of his Systema Naturae under the binomial name Picus minor. Linnaeus specified the locality as Europe but this is now restricted to Sweden. The species was moved to the genus Dendrocopos by the German naturalist Carl Ludwig Koch in 1816. A molecular phylogenetic study published in 2015 based on nuclear and mitochondrial DNA sequences found that the species placed in the genus Dendrocopos did not form a monophyletic group. In the revised generic classification, the lesser spotted woodpecker was placed in the resurrected genus Dryobates, that had originally been introduced by the German naturalist Friedrich Boie in 1826. The genus name Dryobates is from the Ancient Greek druos meaning woodland and batēs meaning walker. The specific minor is Latin for "smaller".

There are 13 recognised subspecies:

- D. m. comminutus, or British lesser spotted woodpecker (Hartert, 1907) – England and Wales
- D. m. minor (Linnaeus, 1758) – Scandinavia and northeast Poland to the Ural Mountains
- D. m. kamtschatkensis (Malherbe, 1860) – Ural Mountains to the Sea of Okhotsk and northern Mongolia
- D. m. immaculatus (Stejneger, 1884) – Anadyr Basin and Kamchatka Peninsula (east Siberia)
- D. m. amurensis (Buturlin, 1908) – northeast China, Siberia, Korea and Hokkaido (Japan)
- D. m. hortorum (Brehm, CL, 1831) – central Europe
- D. m. buturlini Hartert, 1912 – southern Europe, including European Turkey
- D. m. danfordi (Hargitt, 1883) – Asian Turkey (Anatolia) except far northeast; differs from D. m. buturlini and D. m. colchicus in having a complete black postauricular stripe behind the cheek
- D. m. colchicus (Buturlin, 1908) Caucasus and Transcaucasia, including far northeast Turkey (Colchis)
- D. m. quadrifasciatus (Radde, 1884) – southeast Azerbaijan
- D. m. hyrcanus (Zarudny & Bilkevitch, 1913) – north Iran
- D. m. morgani (Zarudny & Loudon, 1904) – southwest Iran
- D. m. ledouci (Malherbe, 1855) – northwest Africa

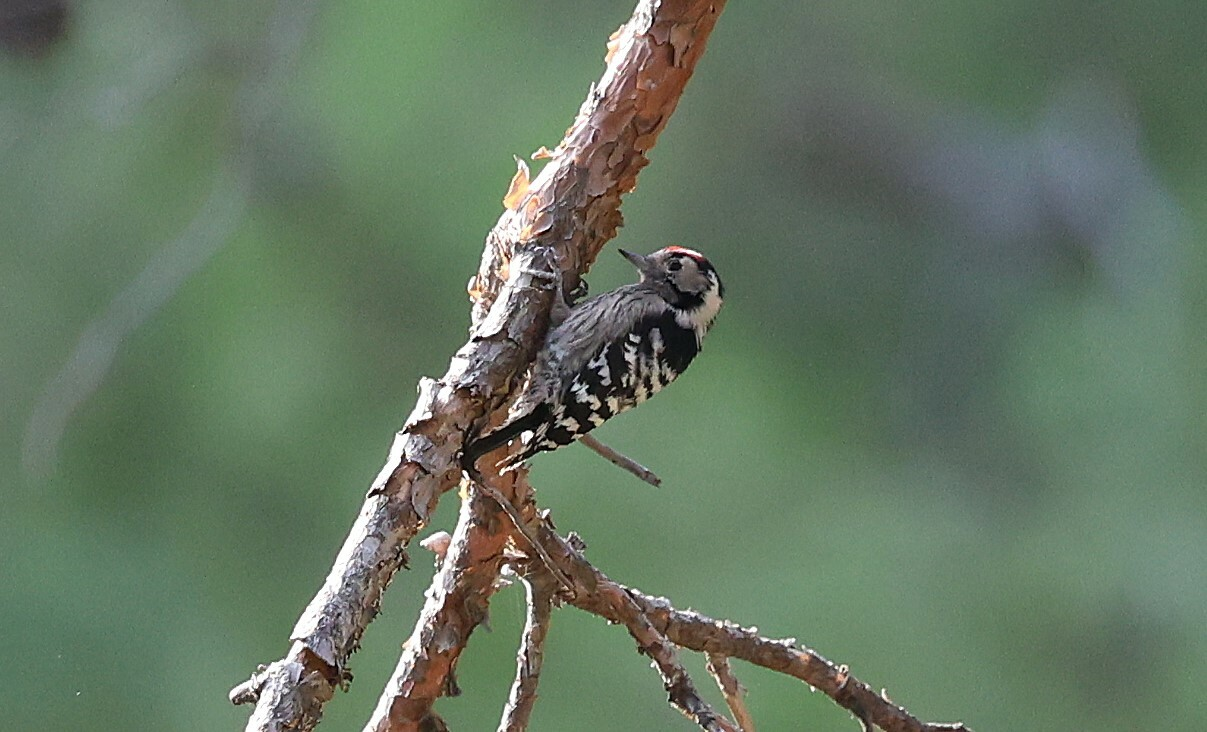
D. m. danfordi near Marmaris, southwest Turkey; note black stripe behind the cheek

== Description ==
This is the smallest European woodpecker, with adults being 14 to 16.5 cm (5.5 to 6.5 in) long with a wing span of 24 to 29 cm (9.4 to 11.4 in) and weighing 17 to 25 g (0.60 to 0.88 oz). A sample of 50 lesser spotted woodpeckers in Great Britain averaged 19.8 g (0.70 oz) in body mass. From its small size and its habit of spending most of its time in the tops of tall trees in woods and parks, this little woodpecker is often overlooked, but if sighted on a trunk it may at once be identified by the broad barring on the wings and narrower bars across the lower back.

The male has a crimson crown, a brown forehead, a black superciliary stripe, and another from the base of the bill to the neck. The nape and upper back are black, but the lower back is barred with black and white. On the wings are broader and more conspicuous bars, and the outer tail feathers are also barred. The under parts are white with streaks on the flanks. The bill and legs are slate-grey.

In the female the crown is white, but the young birds of both sexes have more or less crimson on the head. There are no marked seasonal changes.

== Ecology ==
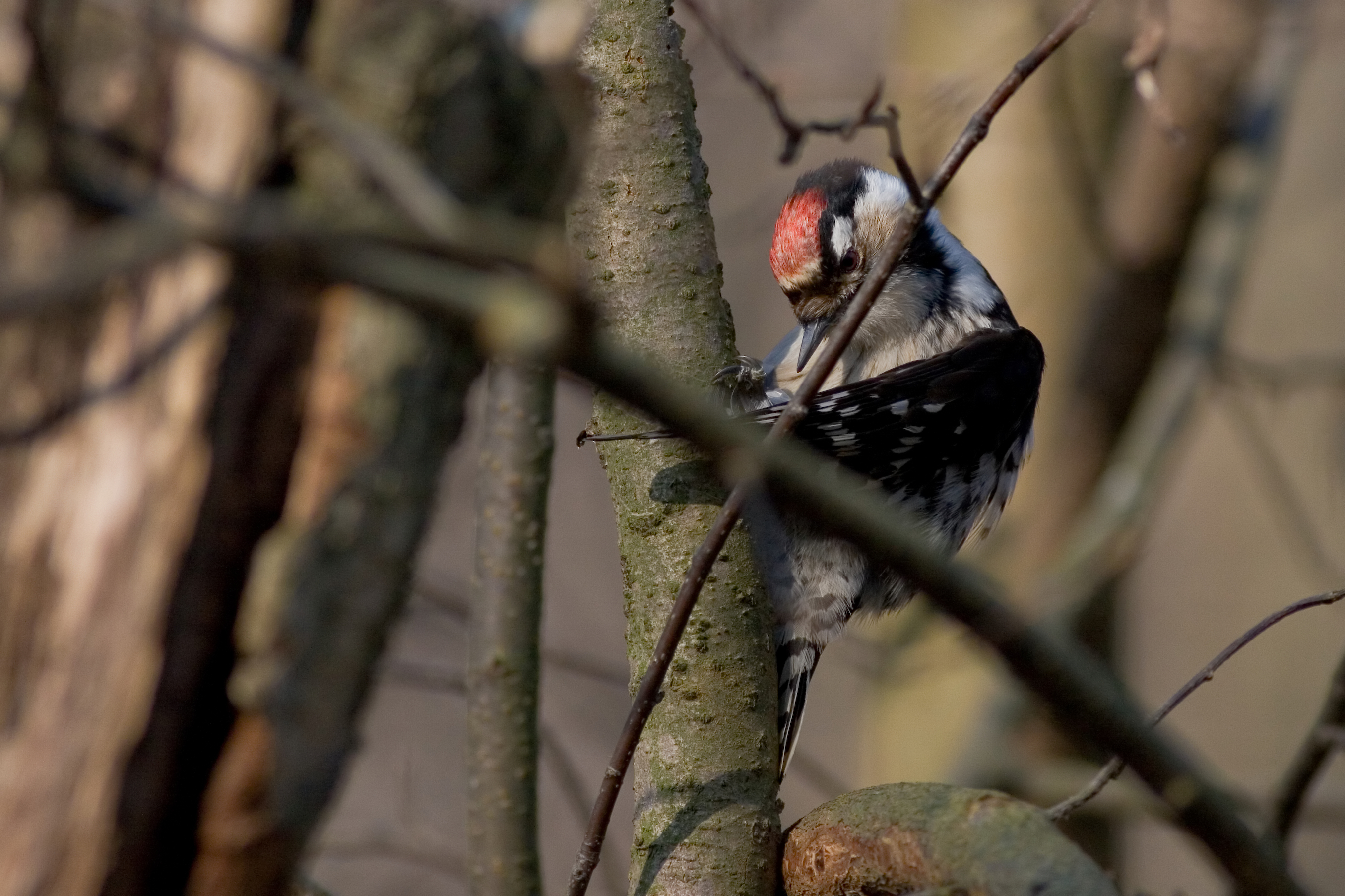
Frontal view

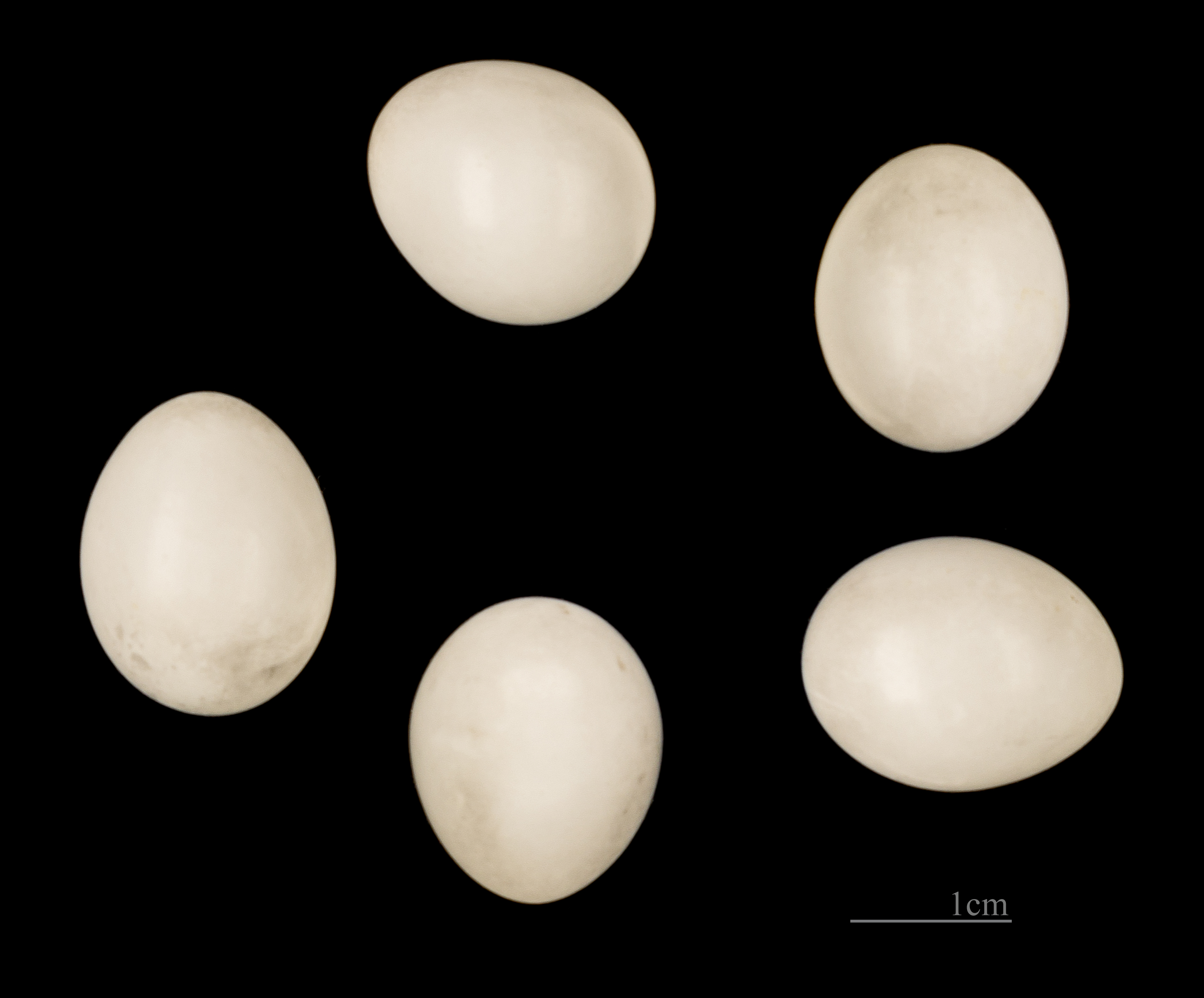
Lesser spotted woodpecker eggs

Its habits are very similar to those of the great spotted woodpecker, and it has the same stumpy appearance, almost triangular, when bounding from tree to tree. Its note is a repeated "keek", loud for so small a bird, and its vibrating rattle can with experience be distinguished from that of the larger species. This substitute for a song may be heard at all times, but most frequently when courtship begins early in the year.

Its insect food is similar to that of the great spotted woodpecker. When hunting for wood-boring larvae it chips away at the rotten wood, and the litter at the foot of a tree is often the first indication that insects are attacking upper branches. From autumn to spring it hunts mainly on wood-living insect larvae, frequently from thin dead branches in living trees. Through the breeding season, surface-living insects from the foliage and bark of trees make up an increased amount of the diet. Nestlings are mainly fed with surface-living insects, such as aphids and larval insects. At night it roosts in old holes.

A litter of chips is also a guide to a nesting hole, for the bird does not always carry these away when excavating. The hole is usually at a considerable height above the ground and may be as high as 10–20 m (33–66 ft). It is a smaller burrow than that of the great spotted woodpecker, measuring from 2.5–5 cm (0.98–1.97 in) in diameter.

The shaft varies, the nesting cavity often being 30 cm (12 in) or more below the entrance. Five to eight highly polished white eggs are laid upon wood dust and chips in the latter half of May, and a single brood is the rule. Both birds help to incubate. Occasionally an old or natural hollow is used or enlarged.

Populations of lesser spotted woodpeckers are mostly resident, but can be nomadic to some degree. Annual fluctuations in population numbers are common. The winter temperatures may have a direct effect on winter survival of lesser spotted woodpeckers by heat loss, whereas weather conditions during spring have an indirect effect on breeding performance by affecting food sources. In 2017, the UK population of lesser spotted woodpeckers was reported to have almost halved since 2009, to around 2,000. The British Ornithology Trust blamed modern habits of removing dead trees quickly from parks and woodland, depriving the birds of the decaying wood which is their favoured nesting habitat.
