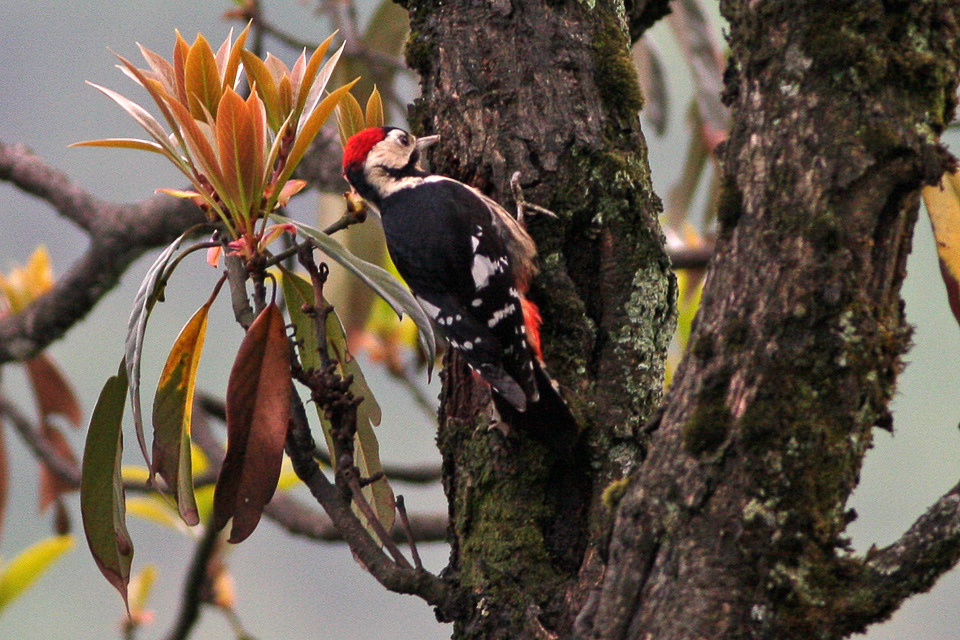
- From Wawu Shan, Sichuan, China.

Conservation status
- Least Concern (IUCN 3.1)

Scientific classification
- Kingdom: Animalia
- Phylum: Chordata
- Class: Aves
- Order: Piciformes
- Family: Picidae
- Genus: Dryobates
- Species: D. pernyii

Binomial name
- Dryobates pernyii (Verreaux, J, 1867)

= Necklaced woodpecker =

Species of bird

The necklaced woodpecker (Dryobates pernyii) is a small species of woodpecker in the genus Dryobates. It is found in Bangladesh, China, Laos, Myanmar, Thailand, and Vietnam. Its natural habitats are subtropical or tropical moist lowland forests and subtropical or tropical moist montane forests.

== Description ==
The necklaced woodpecker is a fairly small (19-21cm), stout, black-and-white woodpecker with buffy underparts. Males have a fiery orange neck patch, a crimson red crown, a muted orange vent, and a red breast patch bordered with a black stripe. Females are duller, though they can sometimes have a pale orange neck and breast patch. The species resembles a miniature Darjeeling woodpecker (Dendrocopos darjellensis) or great spotted woodpecker (Dendrocopos major), though it is not closely related to any of them, belonging to a different genus.

== Taxonomy ==
It was previously considered conspecific with the crimson-naped woodpecker (Dryobates cathpharius). While the two have various amounts of red on head and breast and other distinguishing features, including size. There are three subspecies; D. p. tenebrosus from north and east Myanmar to north Laos, north west Vietnam and south China, D. p. pernyii from central China, D. p. innixus from north-central and east-central China.
