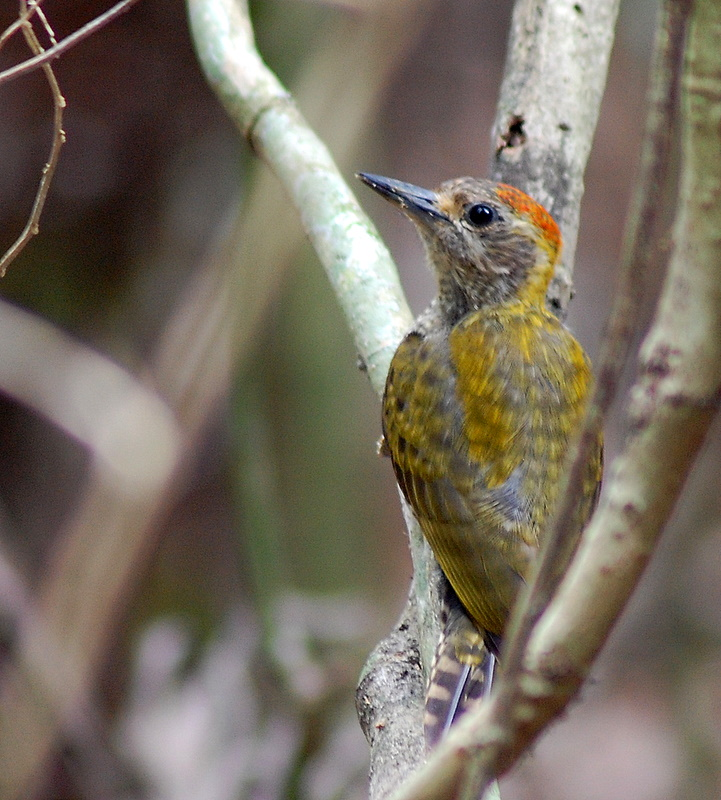
- A male yellow-eared woodpecker (Veniliornis maculifrons) in Ilha Grande, Rio de Janeiro, Brazil.

Scientific classification
- Kingdom: Animalia
- Phylum: Chordata
- Class: Aves
- Order: Piciformes
- Family: Picidae
- Tribe: Melanerpini
- Genus: Veniliornis; Bonaparte, 1854

Type species
- Picus sanguineus Lichtenstein, 1793

Species
- see text

= Veniliornis =

Genus of birds

Veniliornis is a genus of birds in the woodpecker family Picidae. They are native to the Neotropics.

== Taxonomy ==
The genus was introduced by the French ornithologist Charles Lucien Bonaparte in 1854. The word Veniliornis combines the name of the Roman deity Venilia with the Greek word ornis meaning "bird". The type species was designated as the blood-colored woodpecker (Veniliornis sanguineus) by the English zoologist George Robert Gray in 1855.

The genus contains the following 14 species:

| Image | Common name | Scientific name | Distribution |
|---|---|---|---|
| | Scarlet-backed woodpecker | Veniliornis callonotus | Colombia, Ecuador and northern Peru |
| | Yellow-vented woodpecker | Veniliornis dignus | Colombia, Ecuador, Peru, and Venezuela |
| | Bar-bellied woodpecker | Veniliornis nigriceps | Bolivia, Colombia, Ecuador, and Peru. |
| | Little woodpecker | Veniliornis passerinus | South America east of the Andes |
| | Dot-fronted woodpecker | Veniliornis frontalis | Argentina and Bolivia. |
| | White-spotted woodpecker | Veniliornis spilogaster | Brazil, Uruguay, eastern Paraguay and northeastern Argentina. |
| | Blood-colored woodpecker | Veniliornis sanguineus | Guyana, Suriname, and French Guiana |
| | Red-rumped woodpecker | Veniliornis kirkii | Costa Rica south and east to Ecuador, Venezuela, Trinidad and Tobago |
| | Red-stained woodpecker | Veniliornis affinis | eastern Brazil and the Amazon Basin. |
| | Chocó woodpecker | Veniliornis chocoensis | Colombia and Ecuador. |
| | Golden-collared woodpecker | Veniliornis cassini | northern Brazil, the Guianas, Venezuela and far eastern Colombia. |
| | Yellow-eared woodpecker | Veniliornis maculifrons | eastern Brazil. |
| | Striped woodpecker | Veniliornis lignarius – formerly in Picoides | southwestern South America. |
| | Checkered woodpecker | Veniliornis mixtus – formerly in Picoides | eastern South America. |
