= Anton August Heinrich Lichtenstein =

German zoologist (1753–1816)

Anton August Heinrich Lichtenstein (25 August 1753, Helmstedt – 17 February 1816, Helmstedt) was a German zoologist. He was the father of Martin Hinrich Carl Lichtenstein (1780–1857).

He studied theology, philosophy, natural history and Oriental studies in Helmstadt, Göttingen and Leipzig, and from 1782 onwards, was rector of the Johanneum in Hamburg. In 1794, he also took on the job of city librarian. Later, he relocated to the University of Helmstedt, where he served as a professor of theology (1798–1810) and Greek language (1804–1810).

He was the author of Catalogus Rerum Naturalium Rarissimarum (1793) and Catalogus Musei zoologici ditissimi Hamburgi (1796), and contributed to Johann Friedrich Wilhelm Herbst's Natursystem der ungeflügelten Insekten (1797).
