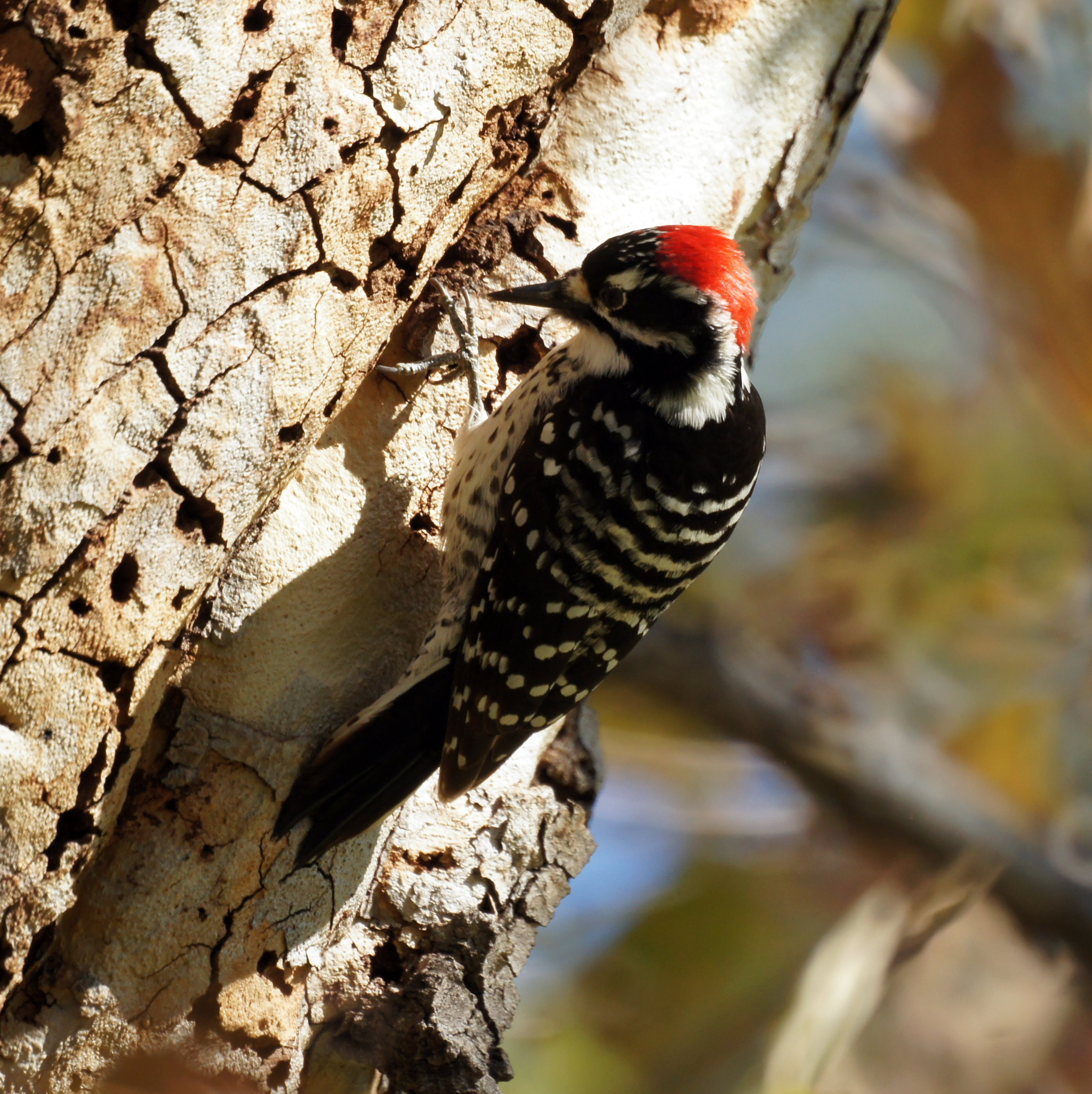
- Male Nuttall's woodpecker in California, USA

Scientific classification
- Kingdom: Animalia
- Phylum: Chordata
- Class: Aves
- Order: Piciformes
- Family: Picidae
- Tribe: Melanerpini
- Genus: Dryobates; F. Boie, 1826

Species
- Seven, see text

= Dryobates =

Genus of birds

Dryobates is a genus of birds in the woodpecker family Picidae. The species are widely distributed and occur in both Eurasia and the Americas.

== Taxonomy ==
The genus Dryobates was named by the German naturalist Friedrich Boie in 1826 with the downy woodpecker (Dryobates pubescens) as the type species.

The genus name Dryobates is from the Greek compound word δρυο-βάτης : 'woodland walker'; from δρῦς : drus (genitive δρυός : dryós) meaning woodland and -βάτης : -bátēs meaning walker. In the eBird/Clements Checklist of Birds of the World, the genus Dryobates is expanded to include all the species in Leuconotopicus and Veniliornis.

The genus contains the following species:

Genus Dryobates – F. Boie, 1826 – Six species
Common name	Scientific name and subspecies	Range	Size and ecology	IUCN status and estimated population
Nuttall's woodpecker Male Female	Dryobates nuttallii (Gambel, 1843)	northern California extending south towards the northwest region of Baja California, Mexico	Size: Habitat: Diet:	LC
Downy woodpecker Male Female	Dryobates pubescens (Linnaeus, 1766) Seven subspecies: D. p. glacialis (Grinnell, 1910); D. p. medianus (Swainson, 1832); D. p. fumidus (Maynard, 1889); D. p. gairdnerii (Audubon, 1839); D. p. turati (Malherbe, 1860); D. p. leucurus (Hartlaub, 1852); D. p. pubescens (Linnaeus, 1766)	North America	Size: Habitat: Diet:	LC
Ladder-backed woodpecker Male Female	Dryobates scalaris (Wagler, 1829)	Southwestern United States (north to extreme southern Nevada and extreme southeastern Colorado), most of Mexico, and locally in Central America as far south as Nicaragua	Size: Habitat: Diet:	LC
Lesser spotted woodpecker Male Female	Dryobates minor (Linnaeus, 1758) Thirteen subspecies: D. m. comminutus (Hartert, 1907); D. m. minor (Linnaeus, 1758); D. m. kamtschatkensis (Malherbe, 1860); D. m. immaculatus (Stejneger, 1884); D. m. amurensis (Buturlin, 1908); D. m. hortorum (Brehm, CL, 1831); D. m. buturlini Hartert, 1912; D. m. danfordi (Hargitt, 1883); D. m. colchicus (Buturlin, 1908); D. m. quadrifasciatus (Radde, 1884); D. m. hyrcanus (Zarudny & Bilkevitch, 1913); D. m. morgani (Zarudny & Loudon, 1904); D. m. ledouci (Malherbe, 1855) – northwest Africa	Europe and northern Asia	Size: Habitat: Diet:	LC
Crimson-naped woodpecker	Dryobates cathpharius (Blyth, 1843) Two subspecies: D. c. ludlowi; D. c. pyrrhothorax	Bhutan, China, India, Myanmar and Nepal	Size: Habitat: Diet:	LC
Necklaced woodpecker	Dryobates pernyii (Verreaux, J,, 1867)	Bangladesh, China, Laos, Myanmar, Thailand, and Vietnam	Size: Habitat: Diet:	LC
