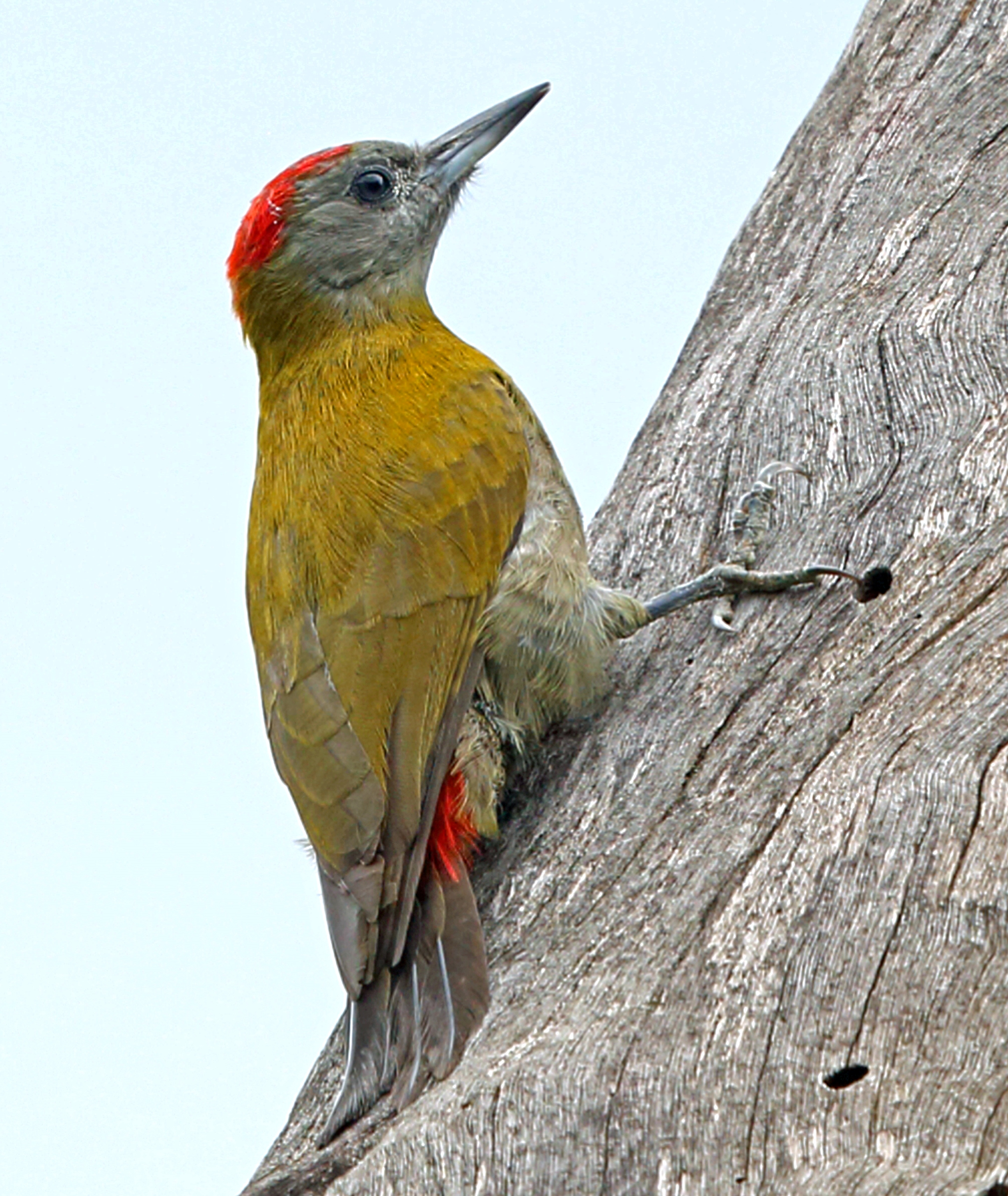
- D. g. subsp. griseocephalus

Conservation status
- Least Concern (IUCN 3.1)

Scientific classification
- Kingdom: Animalia
- Phylum: Chordata
- Class: Aves
- Order: Piciformes
- Family: Picidae
- Genus: Dendropicos
- Species: D. griseocephalus

Binomial name
- Dendropicos griseocephalus (Boddaert, 1783)
- Geographic distribution shown in green

Synonyms
- Chloropicus griseocephalus

= Olive woodpecker =

Species of bird in the woodpecker family

The olive woodpecker (Dendropicos griseocephalus) is a species of bird in the woodpecker family Picidae. It is in the Dendropicos genus, which comprises small woodpeckers native to Sub-Saharan Africa. There are three described subspecies, all inhabiting various regions of southeast Africa; the red-bellied olive woodpecker (D. g. ruwenzori), the montane olive woodpecker (D. g. kilimensis), and the southern olive woodpecker (D. g. griseocephalus).

The olive woodpecker can be characterized by its bright red rump, and bronze coloured upper body. The red-bellied subspecies is known to be slightly brighter in colour, with a more prominent belly patch. The montane subspecies is the smallest of the three recognized subspecies.

These birds occupy a range of densely wooded and forested habitats from 450–3,700 m (1,480–12,140 ft). This species is insectivorous, often seen foraging for ants and beetles in mossy trees.

The olive woodpecker produces a wide range of vocalizations from alarm calls, to specific take-off and flight sounds. This species also makes use of breeding calls to attract mates. Breeding season is variable, and depends on the area each population inhabits. It can last anywhere from 1 to 8 months. Clutch size is small —2 to 3 eggs per clutch—and chick rearing responsibilities are shared between both parents.

== Taxonomy ==
The olive woodpecker was described by the French polymath Georges-Louis Leclerc, Comte de Buffon in 1780 in his Histoire Naturelle des Oiseaux from a specimen obtained from the Cape of Good Hope area of South Africa. The bird was also illustrated in a hand-coloured plate engraved by François-Nicolas Martinet in the Planches Enluminées D'Histoire Naturelle which was produced under the supervision of Edme-Louis Daubenton to accompany Buffon's text. Neither the plate caption nor Buffon's description included a scientific name but in 1783 the Dutch naturalist Pieter Boddaert coined the binomial name Picus griseocephalus in his catalogue of the Planches Enluminées. The olive woodpecker is now placed in the genus Dendropicos that was introduced by the French ornithologist Alfred Malherbe in 1849. The generic name is from the Ancient Greek dendron meaning tree and pikos for woodpecker. The specific epithet griseocephalus combines the Medieval Latin griseus meaning "grey" and the Ancient Greek -kephalos meaning "-headed". The olive woodpecker is a polytypic species, and contains three distinct subspecies. It is estimated that the first split within the olive woodpecker species occurred between Central/Eastern African and Southern populations, approximately 0.5-0.7 mya. Shortly after, the ruwenzori and kilimensis subspecies became distinct. The geographical boundary between these two subspecies is hypothesized to be the Makambako Gap or the Unzugwa Plateau.

Today, three subspecies are recognised:

- Red-bellied: D. g. ruwenzori (Sharpe, 1902) – Angola, north Zambia, north Malawi and central Tanzania to southeast DR Congo and southwest Uganda
- Montane: D. g. kilimensis (Neumann, 1926) – north and east Tanzania
- Southern: D. g. griseocephalus (Boddaert, 1783) – south Mozambique to South Africa

The ruwenzori populations inhabiting Central Africa are sometimes considered to be a separate, fourth subspecies known as D. g. persimilis. However, this taxonomic separation is considered difficult to uphold, due to the similarity of the two subspecies.

== Description ==
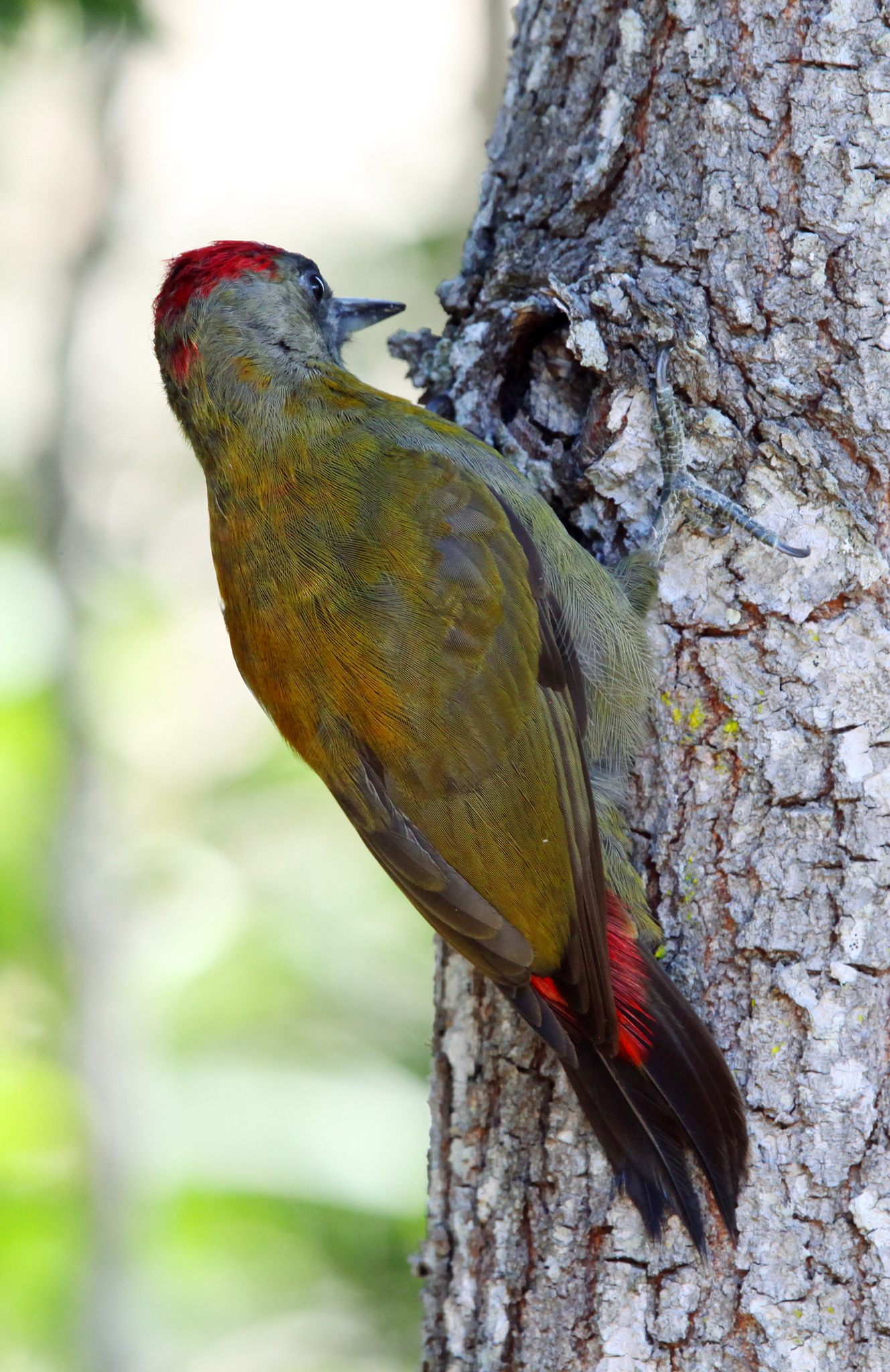
olive woodpecker (Dendropicos griseocephalus grisecephalus), Male, Hoekwil, Western Cape, South Africa.

The olive woodpecker is mostly plain, and lacks many of the patterns typically observed in other woodpecker species. It is characterized by a bright scarlet rump and upper-tail coverts, better revealed in flight. These scarlet feathers often have grey bases, and black subterminal bars. It has a darkish grey forecrown, hindneck, chin and neck, sometimes with black markings on its forehead. The olive woodpecker's belly is dark grey and olive coloured, with lighter golden tones on the breast. It displays a red or pink belly-patch which can vary in size. Its mantle is typically olive-coloured, with darker golden and bronze tones. Flanks occasionally feature whitish barring. Wings are bronze or dark brown with subtle white spotting and barring on flight feathers. Flight feathers often feature olive green or reddish edges. Wing coverts have pale, bronzy green edges. Underwing is a pale brown. The olive woodpecker's tail is blackish brown and lacks barring. Some tail feathers feature an olive green edge. Undertail is brownish, with greyer undertail coverts. The olive woodpecker has a grey upper mandible, and bluish lower mandible. Its bill is long and straight. The olive woodpecker has greyish or olive coloured legs. Its irises are typically brown.

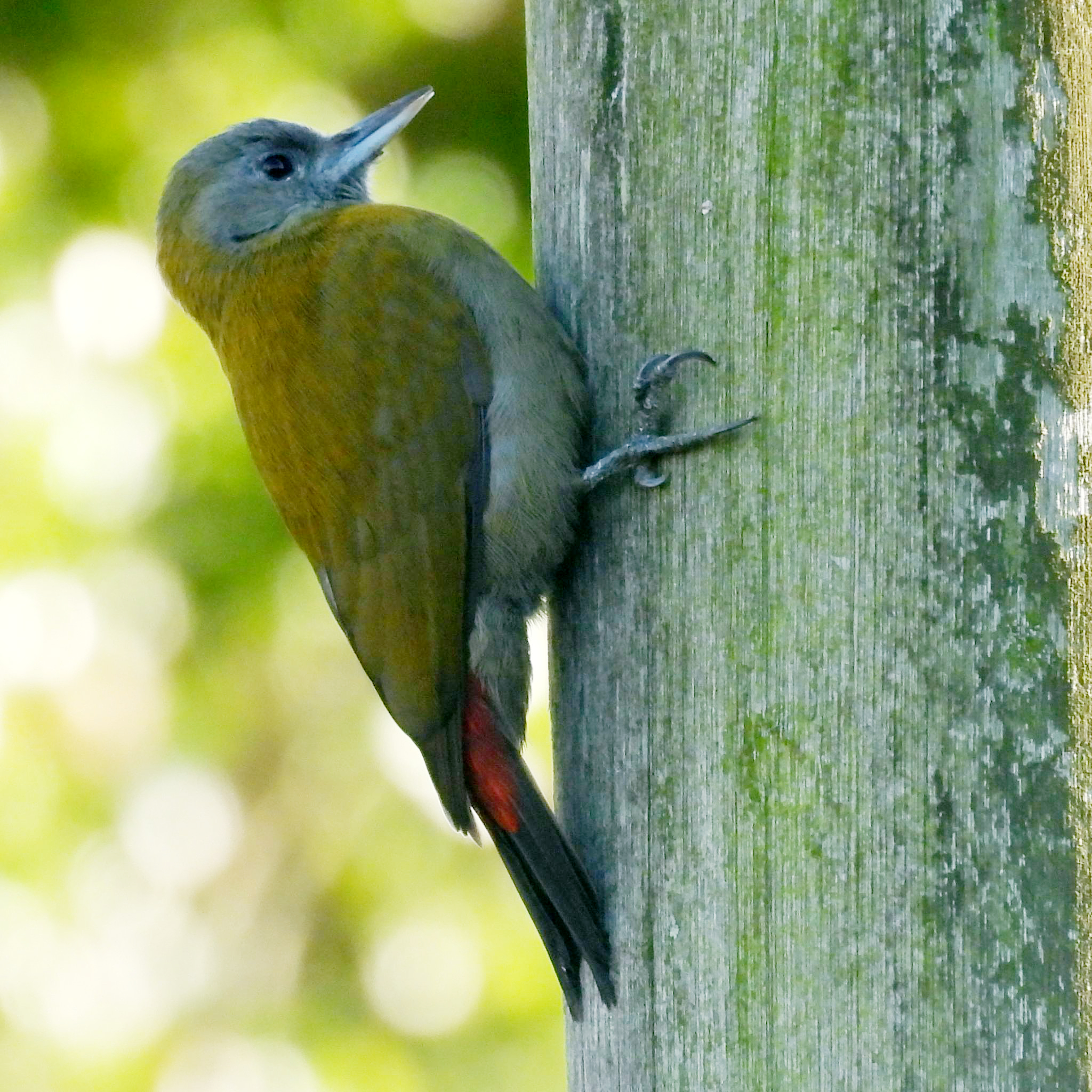
olive woodpecker (Dendropicos griseocephalus grisecephalus), Female, Cacadu, Eastern Cape, South Africa.

The olive woodpecker does exhibit sexual dimorphism. Males have a prominent red nape and mid-crown, whereas females' heads are fully grey. Females also have a shorter bill than males. Juveniles feature duller colours than adults. Their mantles are slightly greener than in adults, their breasts and bellies are greyer and lack the yellow hues found in adults. Juvenile olive woodpeckers have little or no red on their belly, and their rump is a paler red.

The ruwenzori subspecies tends to be brighter in coloration compared to other olive woodpecker subspecies; it is more yellow and golden above and its breast is also more golden. This subspecies also has more evident barring on its flight-feathers, with a more extensive red belly patch. The kilimensis subspecies tends to be smaller, on average, than the nominate subspecies. It is characterized by less yellow in its upperparts, as well as more grey in its underparts. It lacks the red belly patch, but can have red eyes.

=== Similar species ===
The olive woodpecker is similar to the African Gray Woodpecker (Dendropicos goertae) and Mountain Gray Woodpecker (Dendropicos spodocephalus). It distinguishes itself from these species by exhibiting a much darker general coloration. Additionally, the olive woodpecker has no barring on its tail, and a more golden tinged breast.

== Habitat and distribution ==
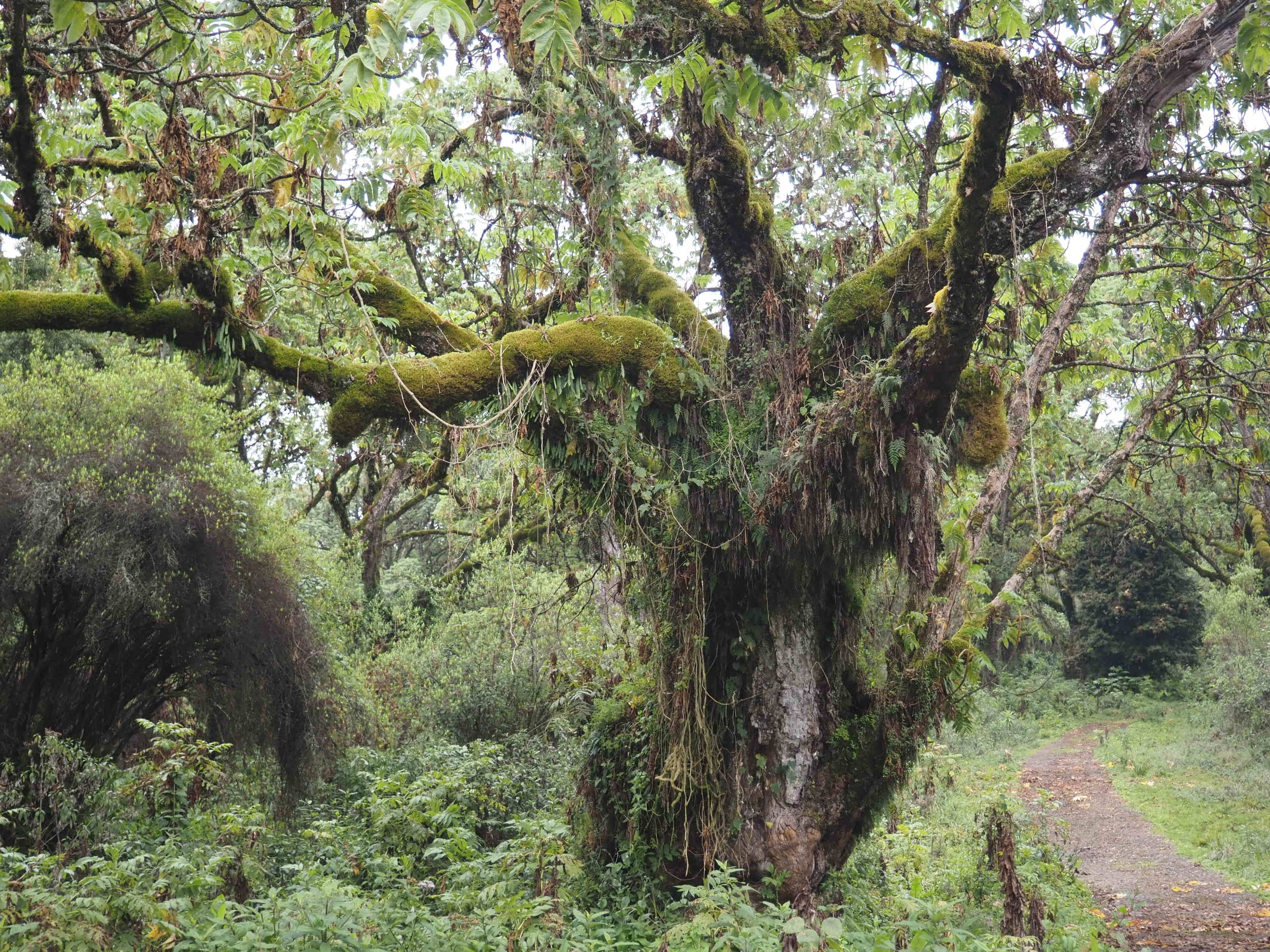
Hagenia (Hagenia) trees with moss, typical olive woodpecker habitat.

The olive woodpecker inhabits forests characterized by dense woodlands and evergreen thickets that border rivers and streams. It prefers open areas, like Hagenia-dominated forests. Further, it tends to prefer to inhabit separated forest patches, over continuous forests. The olive woodpecker is more likely to be found inland, evergreen forests rather than in coastal areas. However, this woodpecker is the only member of the picidae family found in coastal, South African bush. This bird occurs at altitudes of 450m to 3,700m. It is a resident species, and migration is limited to local and short-distance movements.

The olive woodpecker is native to central, east and southern Africa, from the Ruwenzori Mountains to the Western Cape. It is found in Angola, Burundi, DRC, Eswatini, Malawi, Mozambique, Namibia, Rwanda, South Africa, Tanzania, Uganda, Zambia, and Zimbabwe.

== Behaviour ==
=== Vocalizations ===
The olive woodpecker is known to give many different vocalizations. This woodpecker produces a short, nasally 3 to 4 note whistle "whee-whee-whee" . It is also known to emit a mocking or quivering "yeh-yeh-yeh-yeh". Sometimes, the olive woodpecker can also produce a squeaky "tweet-tweet-tweet". Within groups, these woodpeckers conversate with "pep" or "pep-pep-pep" notes. Alarm calls are typically a loud "tick", "queek" or "tweet" followed by a "chi-r-r-r-re" sound. On take-off, these birds commonly release a "tweet" sound, whereas in flight, they release a "wat-chew" sound. Two conspecifics at a close distance communicate with quiet "kiwi-kiwi-kiwi" sounds. Nestlings emit a high-pitched "kee-kee-kee-kee-kee" twitter.

The olive woodpecker sometimes produces rapid but soft, drums, in 1-second rolls.

=== Diet and foraging ===
The olive woodpecker feeds mostly on insects and their larvae, especially ants and beetles. This species often forages for food in pairs, and sometimes in family groups of up to six. It has also been reported to forage in interspecific feeding flocks. This woodpecker is strictly an arboreal forager, using its bill to laterally peck and probe at moss and lichen growing on tree bark. It generally prefers to forage in small trees, or small branches in larger trees. This allows the olive woodpecker to move quickly through a tree, shifting backwards or sideways as it feeds. It prefers to feed at heights of 10m to 15m, but can be found foraging anywhere from 1–24 m from the ground.

=== Reproduction ===
The olive woodpecker's breeding season varies by location, and tends to be longer in northern populations. In Tanzania, they breed from April–June; in the Democratic Republic of Congo from February–September; in Malawi from July–September, in northern South Africa in September; in southern South Africa from October–November; in Angola in June. The olive woodpecker can produce 1 to 2 broods per breeding season.

Males attract a mate by displaying head-swinging accompanied by specific breeding calls. Males are also mainly responsible for excavating nest holes in dead trunks or tree branches, often on the underside of horizontal branches. Breeding territory is small, and nests are typically located anywhere from 1.5-18m above ground. Clutch size is also small, with females typically producing 2-3 eggs. Incubation lasts 15–17 days, and is done by both male and female parents. Both parents are also responsible for sanitizing the nest and providing food to nestlings. However, females typically provide smaller amounts of food more frequently, foraging close to the nest, whereas males venture out further to forage. Both breeding partners roost in the nest during incubation and fledging period. Fledging period usually lasts 26 days, with a relatively low success rate —often only one chick is reared successfully. Fledged chicks remain under the care of parents for three months or more. During this period, the entire family roosts together in their nest. Sometimes, males will care for reared chicks alone, or, if two juveniles are reared, each parent will accompany one fledgling.

== Parasitism ==
The olive woodpecker is one of 6 woodpecker species parasitized by the Scaly-throated Honeyguide. This species will lay 1 egg in each host nest, and has an incubation period of 18 days. Once the Scaly-Throated Honeyguide hatches, the nestling uses its bill hooks to kill the olive woodpecker's young, or destroy its eggs. Furthermore, parasite fledglings may beg for food from passing woodpecker, indiscriminately.

== Conservation status ==
According to the IUCN's red list, the olive woodpecker is classified as a species of least concern since 2004. This means that it is not considered globally threatened. In fact, this woodpecker has a considerably large range which is significantly larger than the range threshold (extent of occurrence under 20,000 km^{2}) required for a species to be deemed Vulnerable. Similarly, although the olive woodpecker's population has not been officially quantified, it is reported to be common to uncommon. Its population size is considered far above the population size threshold (under 10,000 mature individuals) required to describe this species as threatened. Current population trends do indicate a 7.7% decline in the olive woodpecker over the past 10 years. However, this decline is not considered rapid enough to meet the IUCN's population trend threshold (over 30% decline over 10 years, or three generations) either. Furthermore, the olive woodpecker is present in several protected areas: Impenetrable Forest National Park (Uganda), Kahuzi-Biega National Park (DRC), Nyungwe Forest Reserve (Rwanda), Kibira National Park (Burundi), Oribi Gorge Nature Reserve and Langeberg, Hlabeni, Balgoan and Ngoye Forest Reserves (South Africa).
