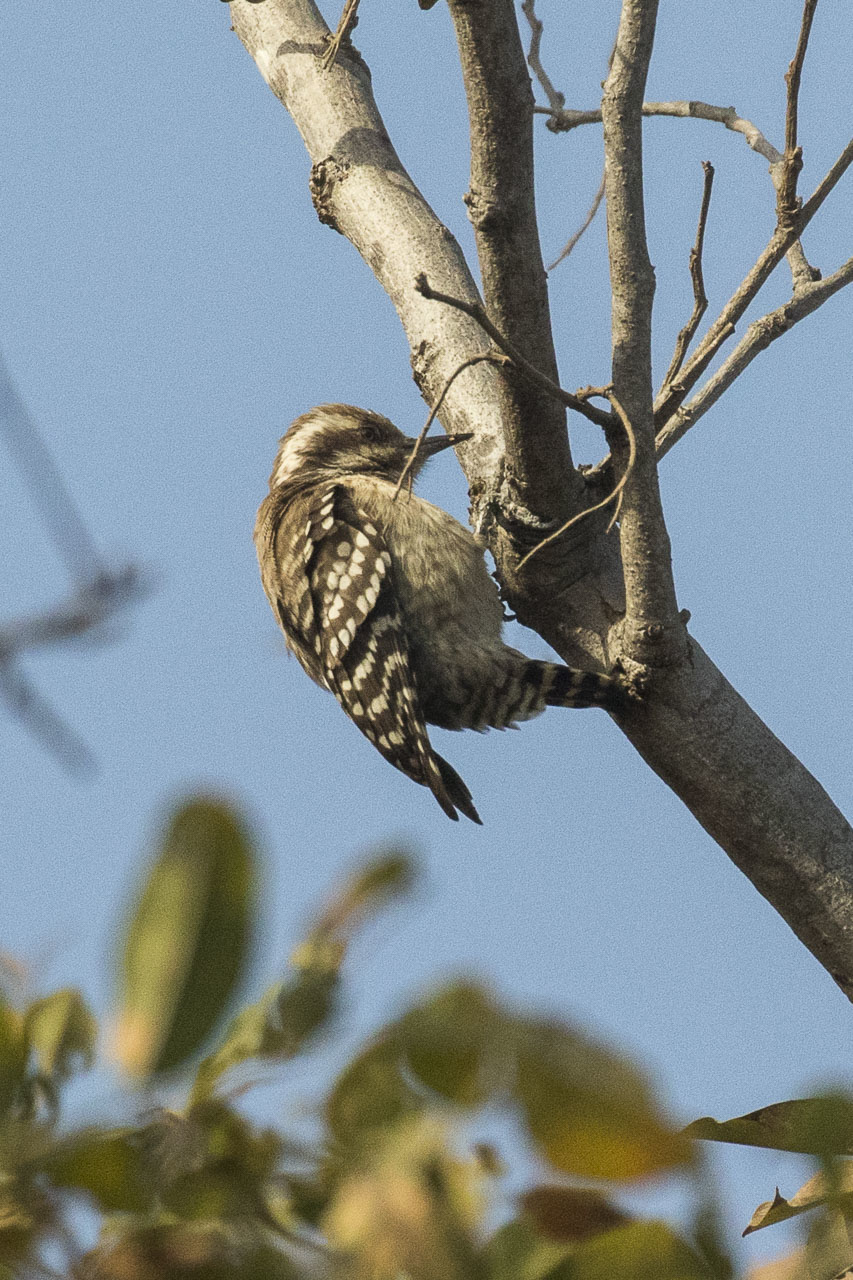

Conservation status
- Least Concern (IUCN 3.1)

Scientific classification
- Kingdom: Animalia
- Phylum: Chordata
- Class: Aves
- Order: Piciformes
- Family: Picidae
- Genus: Dendropicos
- Species: D. obsoletus

Binomial name
- Dendropicos obsoletus (Wagler, 1829)
- Distribution shown in green

Synonyms
- Picoides obsoletus; Chloropicus obsoletus; Ipophilius obsoletus

= Brown-backed woodpecker =

Species of bird

The brown-backed woodpecker (Dendropicos obsoletus) is a species of bird in the woodpecker family Picidae. It is found in a belt across the savannah region of sub-Saharan Africa from Senegal in the west to Ethiopia, Kenya and Tanzania in the east. It is generally uncommon, but has a very large range and the population appears to be steady, so the International Union for Conservation of Nature has rated its conservation status as being of "least concern".

== Taxonomy ==
The brown-backed woodpecker was described by the German naturalist Johann Georg Wagler in 1829 under the binomial name Picus obsoletus. He specified the type locality as Senegambia. The specific epithet is from the Latin obsoletus meaning "plain" or "ordinary". Before the introduction of molecular phylogenetics the relationship to other woodpeckers was uncertain. In 1948 the American ornithologist James Peter placed the brown-backed woodpecker in the genus Dendrocopos in his Check-List of Birds of the World, and in 2013 it was assigned to its own genus Ipophilius by Edward Dickinson and Leslie Christidis in the fourth edition of the Howard and Moore Complete of the Birds of the World. The species is now placed in the genus Dendropicos that was introduced by the French ornithologist Alfred Malherbe in 1849. A genetic study of the African woodpeckers has shown that the brown-backed woodpecker is most closely related to Stierling's woodpecker (Dendropicos stierlingi).

Four subspecies are recognised:

- D. o. obsoletus (Wagler, 1829) – Senegal and Gambia to south Sudan and west Uganda south to south Cameroon and northeast Democratic Republic of the Congo
- D. o. heuglini (Neumann, 1904) – east Sudan to north Ethiopia
- D. o. ingens (Hartert, 1900) – south Ethiopia to Uganda and central Kenya
- D. o. crateri (Sclater, WL & Moreau, 1935) – north Tanzania

== Description ==
The brown-backed woodpecker is a small species, growing to a length of between 13 and 16 cm (5.1 and 6.3 in). The beak is long and chisel-tipped with a wide base. The male has a red hind crown and nape while the female lacks these. Otherwise the sexes are similar, the head is brown with a white supercilium and moustache and dark ear coverts. The body plumage is brown with white barring on the wings and tail and the underparts are whitish, with variable amounts of dark streaking. When the feathers are worn, this bird looks rather pale and can be confused with the little grey woodpecker (Dendropicos elachus).

== Distribution and habitat ==
Its range extends across the entire Sudan region and the southern part of the Sahel, from Guinea Bissau to Eritrea and northern Tanzania. It inhabits open, dry areas, scrubland, the edges of woodland, especially Combretum woodland and Hagenia forest, savannah with scattered trees and suburban gardens. Its altitudinal range is from sea level to about 2,300 m (7,500 ft), and even higher on Mount Kenya.

== Behaviour and ecology ==
=== Breeding ===
Breeding occurs between February and June. The nest is excavated in a dead or living tree at height of 1.5 to 6 m (4 ft 11 in to 19 ft 8 in) above the ground. The tree may be at the edge of wood or in an isolated position away from other trees. The clutch of 2 eggs is incubated by both adults. Both adults also feed the young.
