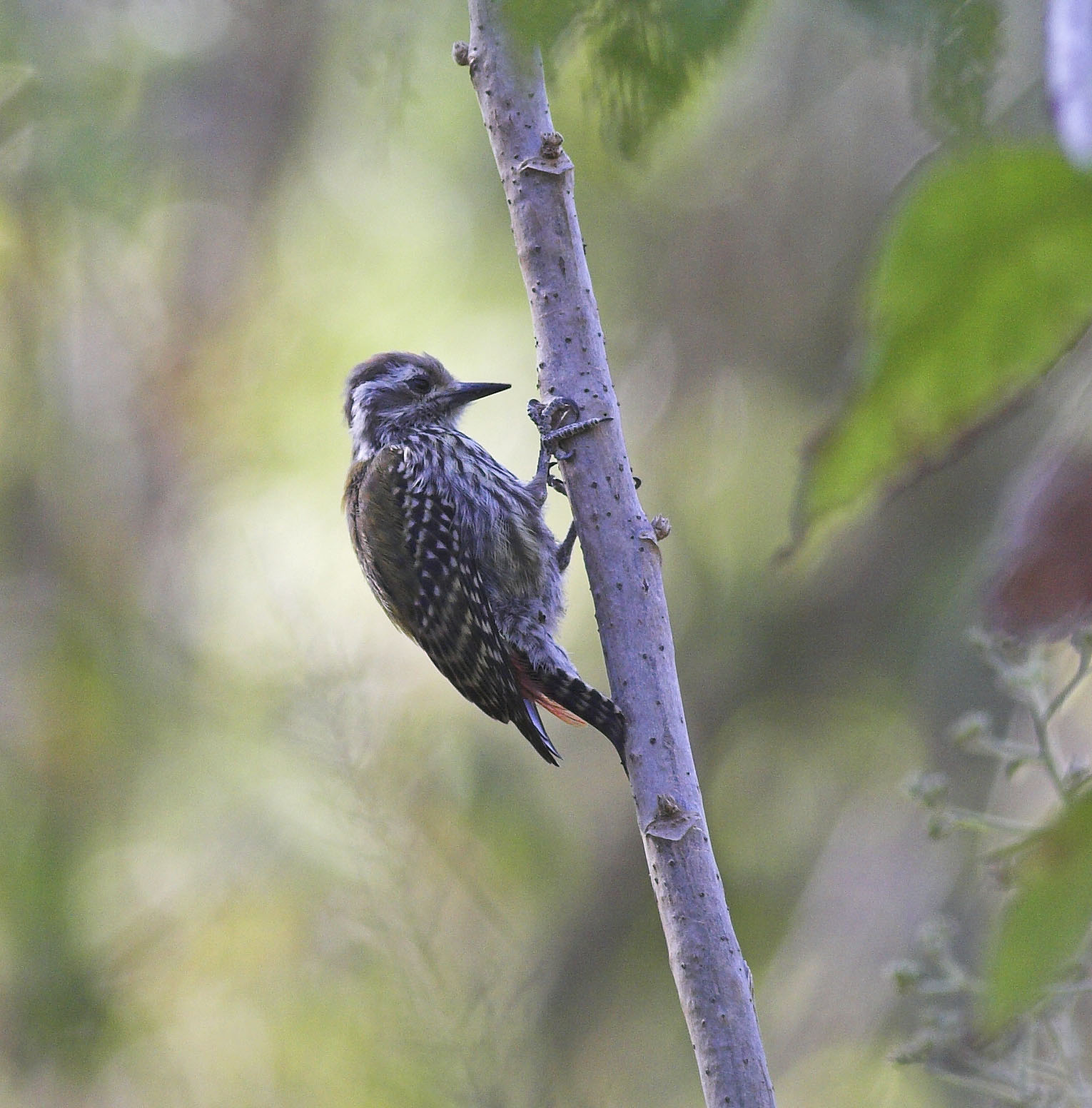

Conservation status
- Least Concern (IUCN 3.1)

Scientific classification
- Kingdom: Animalia
- Phylum: Chordata
- Class: Aves
- Order: Piciformes
- Family: Picidae
- Genus: Dendropicos
- Species: D. abyssinicus

Binomial name
- Dendropicos abyssinicus (Stanley, 1814)

Synonyms
- Picus Abyssinicus (protonym); Chloropicus abyssinicus

= Abyssinian woodpecker =

Species of bird

The Abyssinian woodpecker (Dendropicos abyssinicus), also known as the golden-backed woodpecker or the golden-mantled woodpecker, is a species of bird in the woodpecker family, Picidae. It is native to Africa, where it occurs in Eritrea and Ethiopia. It appears to be a close relative of the cardinal woodpecker Dendropicos fuscescens.

== Description ==
The Abyssinian woodpecker is a very small woodpecker with a relatively long and broad bill. It has a golden yellow back and mantle with a bright red rump and barred wings and barred tail, the underparts are pale and heavily streaked with black. The head is striped and the male is distinguished by having a red nape and crown. The brown stripe through the eye and the golden mantle separate this species from the related Cardinal Woodpecker. It measured 16 cm (6.3 in) in length and weighs 23–26 g (0.81–0.92 oz).

== Distribution and habitat ==
The Abyssinian woodpecker is endemic to the Ethiopian Highlands. It occurs north, up to central Eritrea and the Degua Tembien mountains in Ethiopia, and east to Harar in Ethiopia and the River Alata, a tributary of the Hanger River.

This species occurs in juniper woods and Hagenia forest, also in areas of Euphorbia, particularly between 1,600 and 3,000 m (5,200 and 9,800 ft) and occasionally higher. It has also been found in wooded savanna at lower altitudes.

== Habits ==
The biology and ecology of the Abyssinian woodpecker is almost unknown. It is an unobtrusive bird which probes for food among moss growing on trees. It is thought that the nesting period probably runs between December and May.

== Conservation status ==
The Abyssinian woodpecker has a very large range, and hence does not approach the thresholds for Vulnerable and is currently classed as Least Concern but it is thought to be decreasing in population and contracting its range due to continuing clearance of woodlands.
