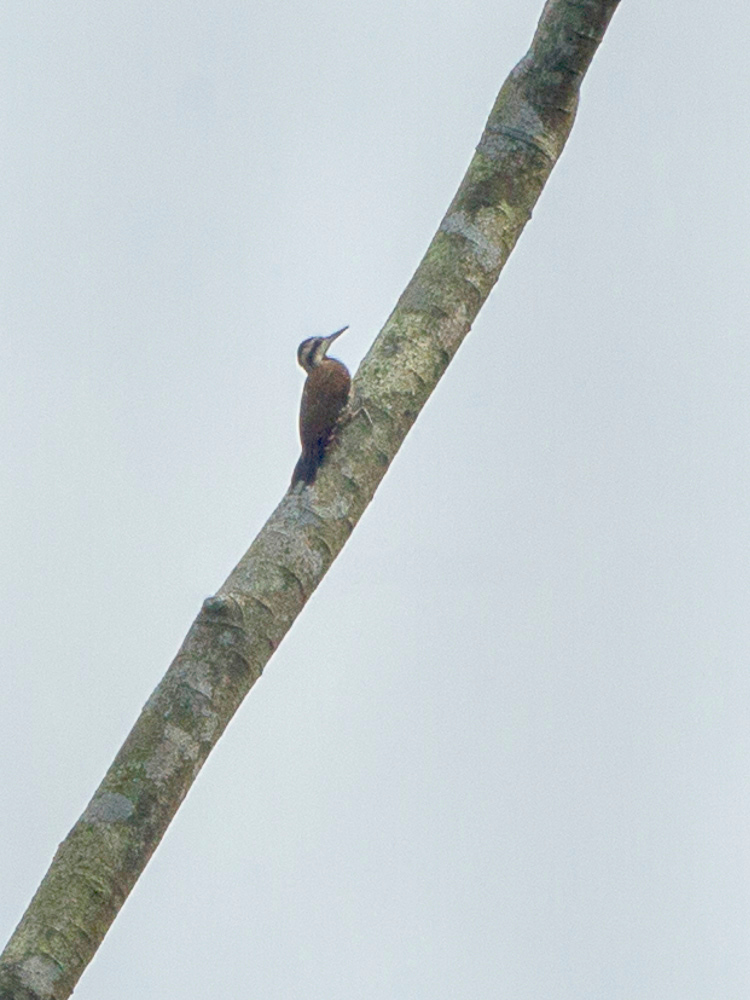

Conservation status
- Least Concern (IUCN 3.1)

Scientific classification
- Kingdom: Animalia
- Phylum: Chordata
- Class: Aves
- Order: Piciformes
- Family: Picidae
- Genus: Chloropicus
- Species: C. pyrrhogaster

Binomial name
- Chloropicus pyrrhogaster (Malherbe, 1845)

Synonyms
- Thripias pyrrhogaster Dendropicos pyrrhogaster

= Fire-bellied woodpecker =

Species of bird

The fire-bellied woodpecker (Chloropicus pyrrhogaster) is a species of bird in the family Picidae. It is found in Benin, Ivory Coast, Ghana, Guinea, Liberia, Mali, Nigeria, Sierra Leone, Togo and western Cameroon. A common species, the IUCN has assessed its conservation status as being of "least concern". Some taxonomic authorities place this species in Dendropicos.

== Description ==
The upper parts of the fire-bellied woodpecker are olive or bronze with slight barring. The wings are brown with some light barring and the upper-tail blackish. The rump and upper tail coverts are crimson. The head and throat are white, boldly marked with a blackish malar streak that extends onto the breast, and a post-ocular streak extending onto the ear-coverts. The breast is cream with dark chevrons on the flanks, the central region and belly being scarlet as far as the vent. The long, sharp beak is grey as are the legs. The sexes are different; the male has a red crown and nape while the female has this area black. The female has a longer tail and shorter beak than the male, and the red on her belly is less distinct. Juveniles are duller and browner than adults, and both sexes have some red on the crown at this age.

== Distribution and habitat ==
The fire-bellied woodpecker is native to tropical West Africa, its range extending from Upper Guinea and Sierra Leone eastwards to southern Nigeria and western Cameroon. It is found in the lowlands and foothills, its habitat being clearings and edges of primary rainforest; it is also found in gallery forest, scattered woodland, partially logged and degraded areas, wooded savanna and scrubby bush, and there are usually some large dead trees within its range. It is a non-migratory species.

== Ecology ==
This woodpecker is usually seen in pairs or small family groups, but it sometimes associates with other insect-eating birds. It forages for insects, especially beetle larvae, mainly in the canopy and on dead standing trees, but sometimes descends onto fallen trees. Both sexes drum in the dry season in repeated, short rapid bursts, at the rate of 14 to 38 strikes per second.

== Status ==
C. pyrrhogaster has a very wide range and is a generally common or fairly common species that appears to be increasing in population size, benefiting from the fact that a few large trees are often left standing when forest is cleared. The International Union for Conservation of Nature has assessed its conservation status as being of "least concern".
