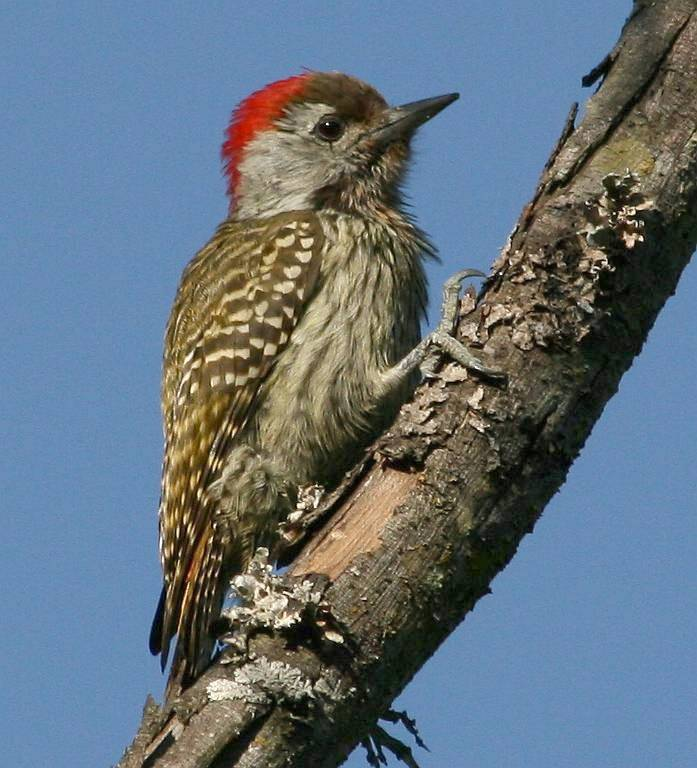
- Cardinal woodpecker (Dendropicos fuscescens)

Scientific classification
- Kingdom: Animalia
- Phylum: Chordata
- Class: Aves
- Order: Piciformes
- Family: Picidae
- Tribe: Melanerpini
- Genus: Dendropicos; Malherbe, 1849

Type species
- Dendropicos lafresnayi (cardinal woodpecker) Malherbe, 1849

Species
- see text

= Dendropicos =

Genus of birds

Dendropicos is a genus of woodpeckers in the family Picidae. They are small woodpeckers that are native to the sub-Saharan woodlands and forests.

== Taxonomy ==
The genus Dendropicos was introduced by the French ornithologist, Alfred Malherbe in 1849. The type species was subsequently designated as one of the subspecies of the cardinal woodpecker. The word Dendropicos comes from the Greek dendron meaning tree and pikos for woodpecker. Molecular genetic studies have shown that the genus Dendropicos is sister to the genus Chloropicus.

The genus Dendropicos formerly contained several additional species. A 2015 molecular phylogenetic study that analysed nuclear and mitochondrial DNA sequences from pied woodpeckers found that Dendropicos was polyphyletic. In the rearranged genera the bearded, fire-bellied and yellow breasted woodpeckers were moved to Chloropicus while the Arabian woodpecker was moved to Dendrocoptes. The taxonomic committee of the British Ornithologists' Union have recommended an alternative arrangement of species in which the genera Dendrocoptes and Leiopicus are combined into a larger Dendropicos.

Elliot's, African grey, eastern grey and olive woodpeckers are sometimes placed in a separate genus, Mesopicos.

The genus contains the following 12 species:

Image	Common name	Scientific name	Distribution
	Little grey woodpecker	Dendropicos elachus	Cameroon, Chad, Gambia, Mali, Mauritania, Niger, Nigeria, Senegal, and Sudan
	Speckle-breasted woodpecker	Dendropicos poecilolaemus	Cameroon, Central African Republic, Chad, Democratic Republic of the Congo, Kenya, Nigeria, Rwanda, South Sudan, and Uganda.
	Abyssinian woodpecker	Dendropicos abyssinicus	Eritrea and Ethiopia
	Cardinal woodpecker	Dendropicos fuscescens	Angola, Benin, Botswana, Burkina Faso, Burundi, Cameroon, Central African Republic, Chad, Congo, Democratic Republic of Congo, Djibouti, Eritrea, Eswatini, Ethiopia, Gabon, Gambia, Ghana, Guinea, Guinea-Bissau, Ivory Coast, Kenya, Lesotho, Malawi, Mali, Mauritania, Mozambique, Namibia, Nigeria, Rwanda, Senegal, Sierra Leone, Somalia, South Africa, South Sudan, Sudan, Tanzania, Togo, Uganda, Zambia and Zimbabwe
	Gabon woodpecker	Dendropicos gabonensis	Southern Nigeria to south-western Cameroon
	Melancholy woodpecker	Dendropicos lugubris	Cameroon, Ivory Coast, Ghana, Guinea, Guinea-Bissau, Liberia, Nigeria, Sierra Leone and Togo
	Stierling's woodpecker	Dendropicos stierlingi	southern Tanzania, southwestern Malawi and northern Mozambique
	Elliot's woodpecker	Dendropicos elliotii	Angola, Cameroon, Central African Republic, Republic of the Congo, Democratic Republic of the Congo, Equatorial Guinea, Gabon, Nigeria, Rwanda, and Uganda
	African grey woodpecker	Dendropicos goertae	Angola, Benin, Burkina Faso, Burundi, Cameroon, Central African Republic, Chad, Congo, Democratic Republic of Congo, Equatorial Guinea, Eritrea, Ethiopia, Gabon, Gambia, Ghana, Guinea, Guinea-Bissau, Ivory Coast, Kenya, Liberia, Mali, Mauritania, Niger, Nigeria, Rwanda, Senegal, Sierra Leone, South Sudan, Sudan, Tanzania, Togo and Uganda
	Eastern grey woodpecker	Dendropicos spodocephalus	Ethiopia, Kenya, South Sudan, Sudan and Tanzania
	Olive woodpecker	Dendropicos griseocephalus	Angola, Burundi, Democratic Republic of the Congo, Eswatini, Malawi, Mozambique, Namibia, Rwanda, South Africa, Tanzania, Uganda, Zambia, and Zimbabwe
	Brown-backed woodpecker	Dendropicos obsoletus	Benin, Burkina Faso, Cameroon, Central African Republic, Chad, Democratic Republic of the Congo, Eritrea, Ethiopia, Gambia, Ghana, Guinea, Guinea-Bissau, Ivory Coast, Kenya, Mali, Mauritania, Niger, Nigeria, Senegal, Sierra Leone, Sudan, Tanzania, Togo, and Uganda

== Description ==
Only males have red plumage in the crown, and some species have red plumage on the rump or belly in either sex.
