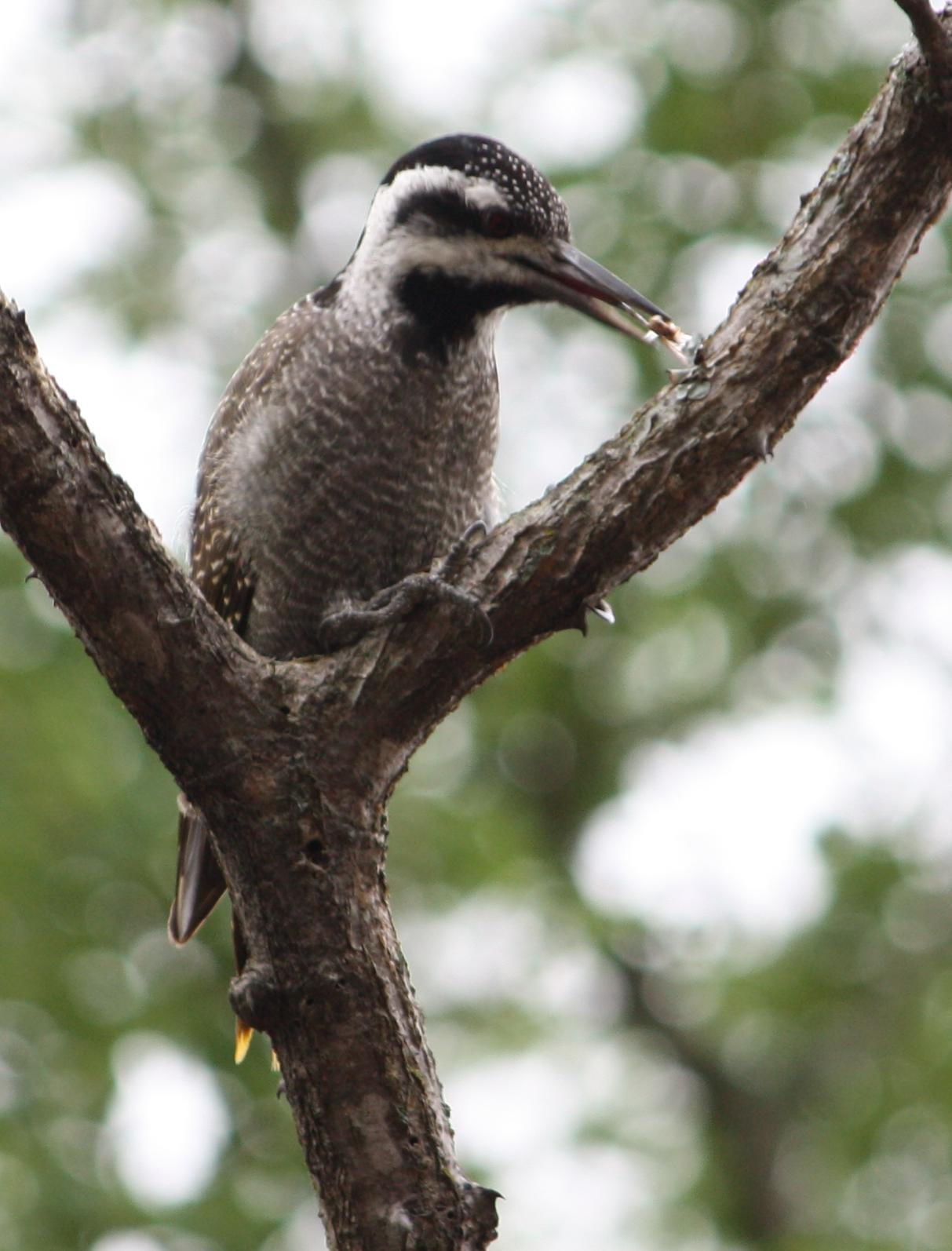
- Bearded woodpecker Chloropicus namaquus

Scientific classification
- Kingdom: Animalia
- Phylum: Chordata
- Class: Aves
- Order: Piciformes
- Family: Picidae
- Tribe: Melanerpini
- Genus: Chloropicus; Malherbe, 1845

Type species
- Picus (Chloropicus) pyrrhogaster Malherbe, 1845

Species
- 3, see text

= Chloropicus =

Genus of birds

Chloropicus is a genus of birds in the woodpecker family Picidae that are native to Sub-Saharan Africa.

== Taxonomy ==
The genus was introduced by the French ornithologist Alfred Malherbe in 1845 with the fire-bellied woodpecker (Chloropicus pyrrhogaster) as the type species. The word Chloropicus is from the Greek khlōros meaning green and pikos meaning woodpecker. Molecular genetic studies have shown that the genus Chloropicus is sister to the genus Dendropicos. Species in this genus were previously sometimes assigned to Dendropicos.

The genus contains the three species:

Image	Scientific name	Common name	Distribution
	Chloropicus namaquus	Bearded woodpecker	Angola, Botswana, Central African Republic, Chad, Democratic Republic of the Congo, Ethiopia, Kenya, Malawi, Mozambique, Namibia, Rwanda, Somalia, South Africa, Sudan, Swaziland, Tanzania, Uganda, Zambia, and Zimbabwe
	Chloropicus xantholophus	Yellow-crested woodpecker	Angola, Cameroon, Central African Republic, Republic of the Congo, Democratic Republic of the Congo, Gabon, Kenya, Nigeria, South Sudan, Tanzania and Uganda.
	Chloropicus pyrrhogaster	Fire-bellied woodpecker	Benin, Ivory Coast, Ghana, Guinea, Liberia, Mali, Nigeria, Sierra Leone, Togo and western Cameroon
