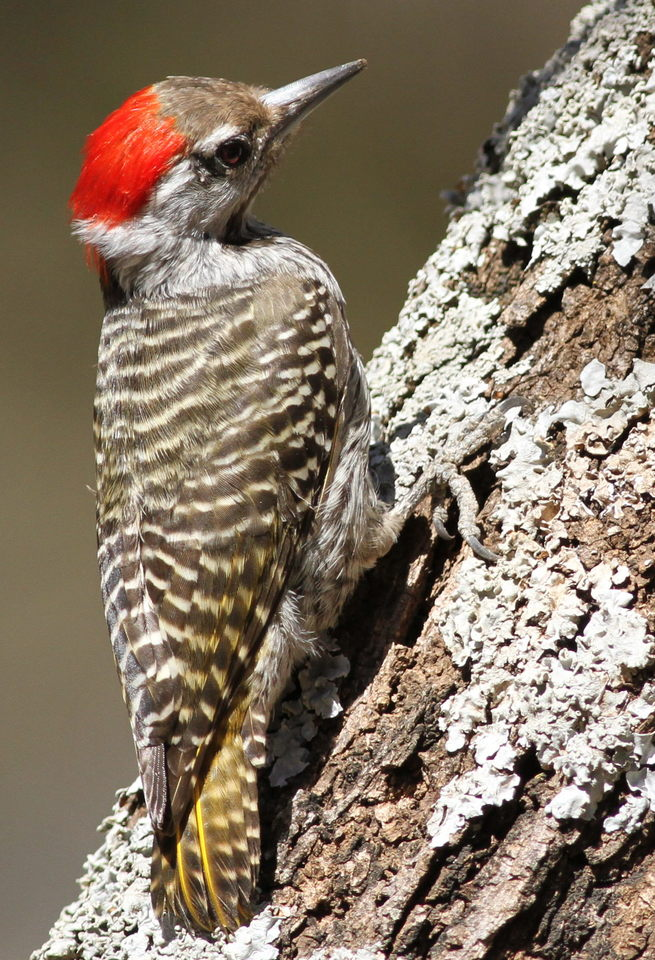

Conservation status
- Least Concern (IUCN 3.1)

Scientific classification
- Kingdom: Animalia
- Phylum: Chordata
- Class: Aves
- Order: Piciformes
- Family: Picidae
- Genus: Dendropicos
- Species: D. fuscescens

Binomial name
- Dendropicos fuscescens (Vieillot, 1818)

Synonyms
- Chloropicus fuscescens

= Cardinal woodpecker =

Species of bird

The cardinal woodpecker (Dendropicos fuscescens) is a widespread and common resident breeder in much of sub-Saharan Africa. It occurs in a wide range of habitats, ranging from dense forest to thorn bush. It is fairly vocal and is easily identified by its call notes. The sexes are distinguishable by their head patterns. They feed primarily on tree-boring insects; using their adhering tongues they extract the insects from holes in wood or bark.

== Taxonomy ==
The cardinal woodpecker was formally described in 1818 by the French ornithologist Louis Pierre Vieillot under the binomial name Picus fuscescens. This woodpecker is now placed with 11 other sub-Saharan woodpeckers in the genus Dendropicos that was introduced by the French ornithologist, Alfred Malherbe in 1849. The word Dendropicos combines the Ancient Greek dendron meaning tree with pikos meaning woodpecker. The specific epithet fuscescens is Modern Latin for "blackish".

A molecular phylogenetic study published in 2017 found that the cardinal woodpecker was sister to the speckle-breasted woodpecker (Dendropicos poecilolaemus).

Nine subspecies are recognized.

- D. f. lafresnayi Malherbe, 1849 – Senegal and Gambia to Nigeria
- D. f. sharpii Oustalet, 1879 – Cameroon to northern Angola
- D. f. lepidus (Cabanis & Heine, 1863) – south Sudan to northwestern Tanzania
- D. f. hemprichii (Ehrenberg, 1833) – lower elevations of Ethiopia to Somalia and Kenya
- D. f. massaicus Neumann, 1900 – middle elevations of Ethiopia to Kenya and Tanzania
- D. f. loandae Grant, CHB, 1915 – Angola to west Tanzania, Zambia, north Namibia, north Botswana, west Zimbabwe and north South Africa
- D. f. hartlaubii Malherbe, 1849 – southern Kenya to central Mozambique
- D. f. intermedius Roberts, 1924 – central Mozambique to eastern South Africa
- D. f. fuscescens (Vieillot, 1818) – southern Africa

== Description ==
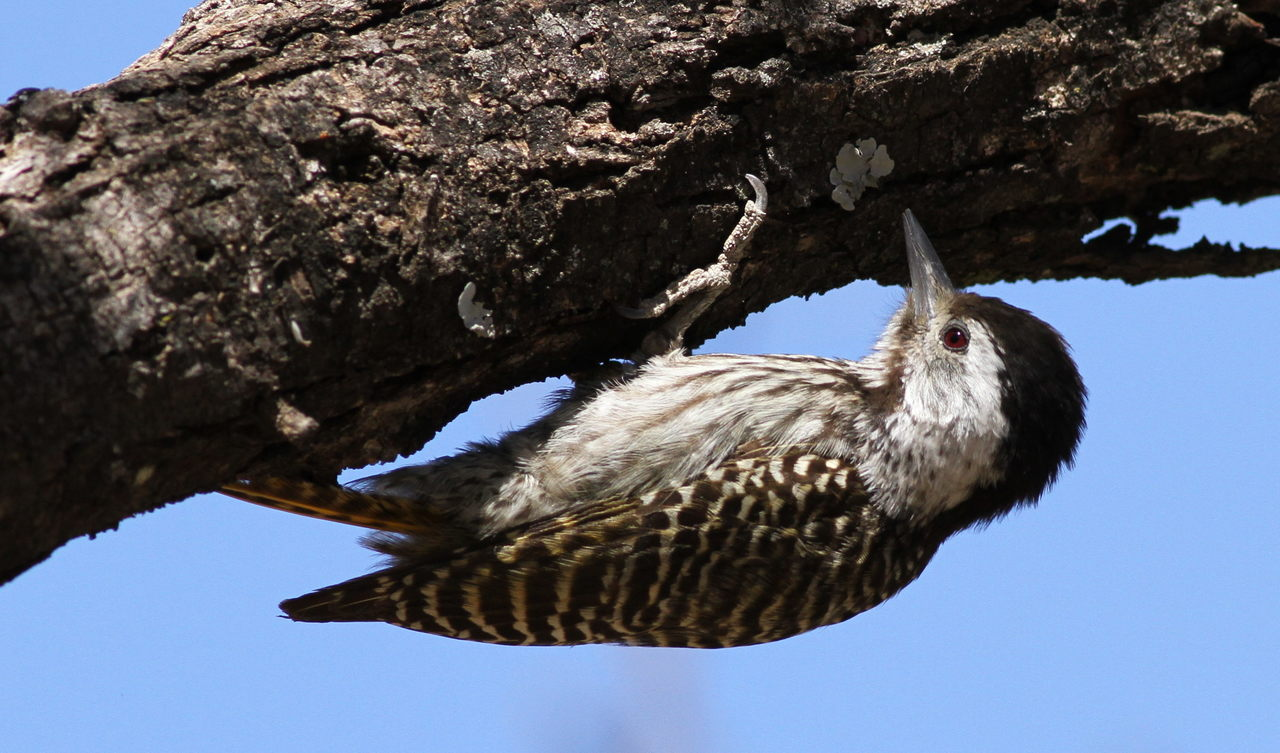
Female on a tree

Female drumming beside a freshly excavated nesting cavity in a suburban setting

Like other woodpeckers, this species has a straight pointed bill, a stiff tail to provide support against tree trunks, and zygodactyl or "yoked" feet, with two toes pointing forward, and two backward. The long tongue can be darted forward to capture insects.

This is a very small woodpecker. It measures 14 to 15 cm (5.5 to 5.9 in) from bill tip to tail tip, and its body shape is typical of a woodpecker. Its back plumage is dull olive in colour, and is marked with paler dots and bands. The underparts are white, heavily streaked with black, and the rump plumage is tawny. The white throat and face are separated by a conspicuous black malar stripe, and the fore crown is olive brown. As with other woodpeckers, the head pattern varies with age and sex. The male has a red hind crown and nape, the female has a dark hind crown and black nape. Juvenile males have a red hind crown and black nape. The small crest is raised when the bird is excited.

== Distribution and habitat ==
The cardinal woodpecker is native to tropical parts of western and central Africa. Its range includes Angola, Benin, Botswana, Burkina Faso, Burundi, Cameroon, Central African Republic, Chad, Congo, Democratic Republic of Congo, Djibouti, Eritrea, Eswatini, Ethiopia, Gabon, Gambia, Ghana, Guinea, Guinea-Bissau, Ivory Coast, Kenya, Lesotho, Malawi, Mali, Mauritania, Mozambique, Namibia, Nigeria, Rwanda, Senegal, Sierra Leone, Somalia, South Africa, South Sudan, Sudan, Tanzania, Togo, Uganda, Zambia and Zimbabwe. It is found in a wide range of habitats from dense forest to thorn bush.

== Behaviour and ecology ==
The cardinal woodpecker often occurs in small family groups or may join small mixed flocks. Forages mainly in the lower storeys of trees and among shrubs and vines, on maize stalks and reeds. Pecks rapidly and probes dense vegetation, clambering along and hanging from small twigs. Like other woodpeckers, this species is an insectivore. It is frequently seen, and regularly drums softly. The call is a high-pitched krrrek-krrrek-krrrek. It nests in a tree hole, unlined apart from wood chippings.

=== Breeding ===
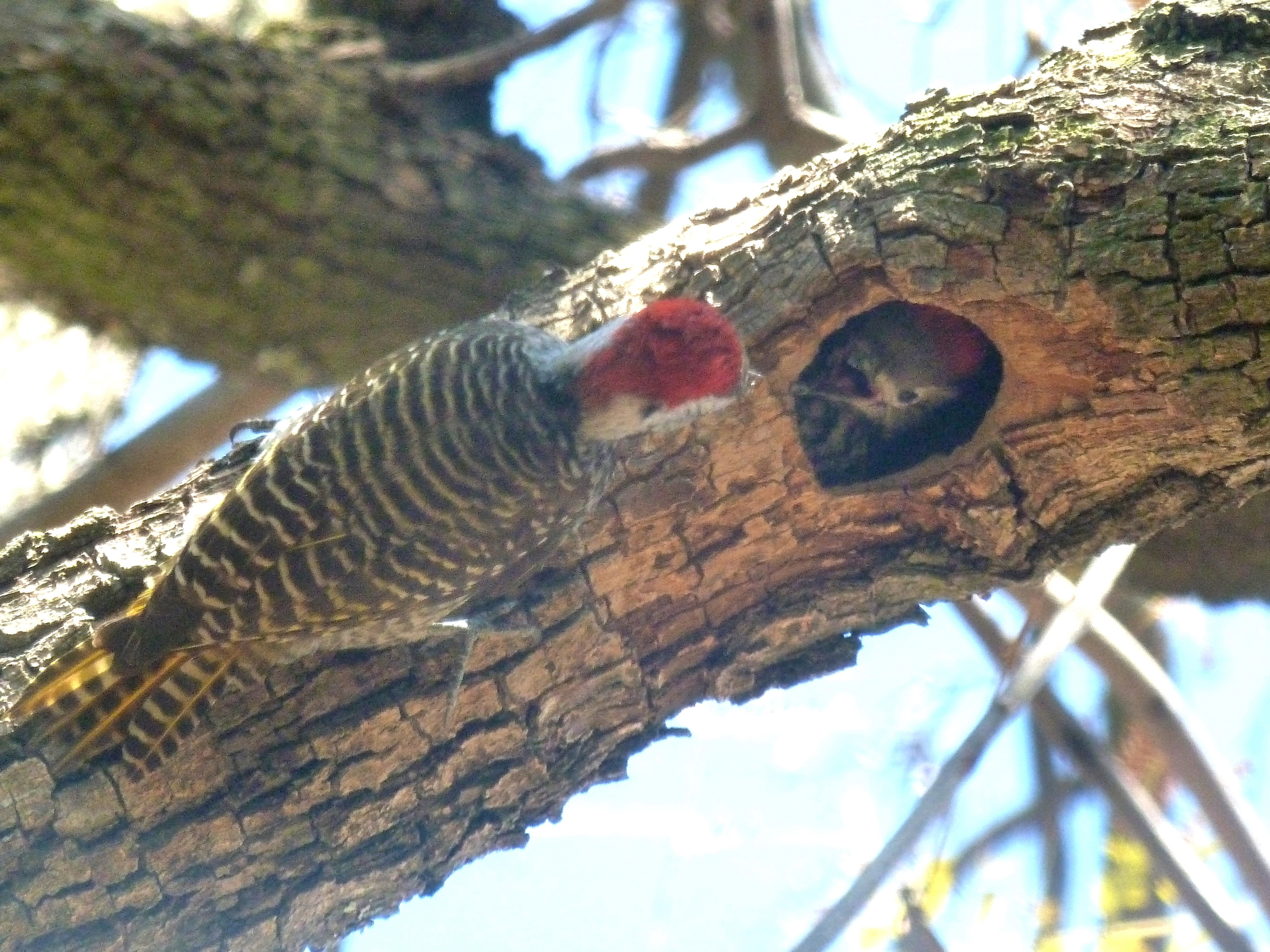
Male parent feeding a single male chick, which is almost ready to fledge

Breeding usually occurs in spring or early summer. Like other woodpecker species they usually excavate a new breeding cavity every season, which takes a few weeks. With this species a nest is not located in the vicinity of the previous season's nest. The entrance hole is oval in shape, and situated about 2 meters from the ground. The glossy white eggs, 1 to 3 in number, are laid on a layer of wood chips. They are laid at one day intervals and incubation starts with the first egg. Both parents partake in incubation, brooding and feeding. The clutch is incubated for about 12 days, and the chicks leave the nest in some 27 days. The young are cared for by the parents for another 8–10 weeks. The scaly-throated honeyguide is recorded as a nest parasite.

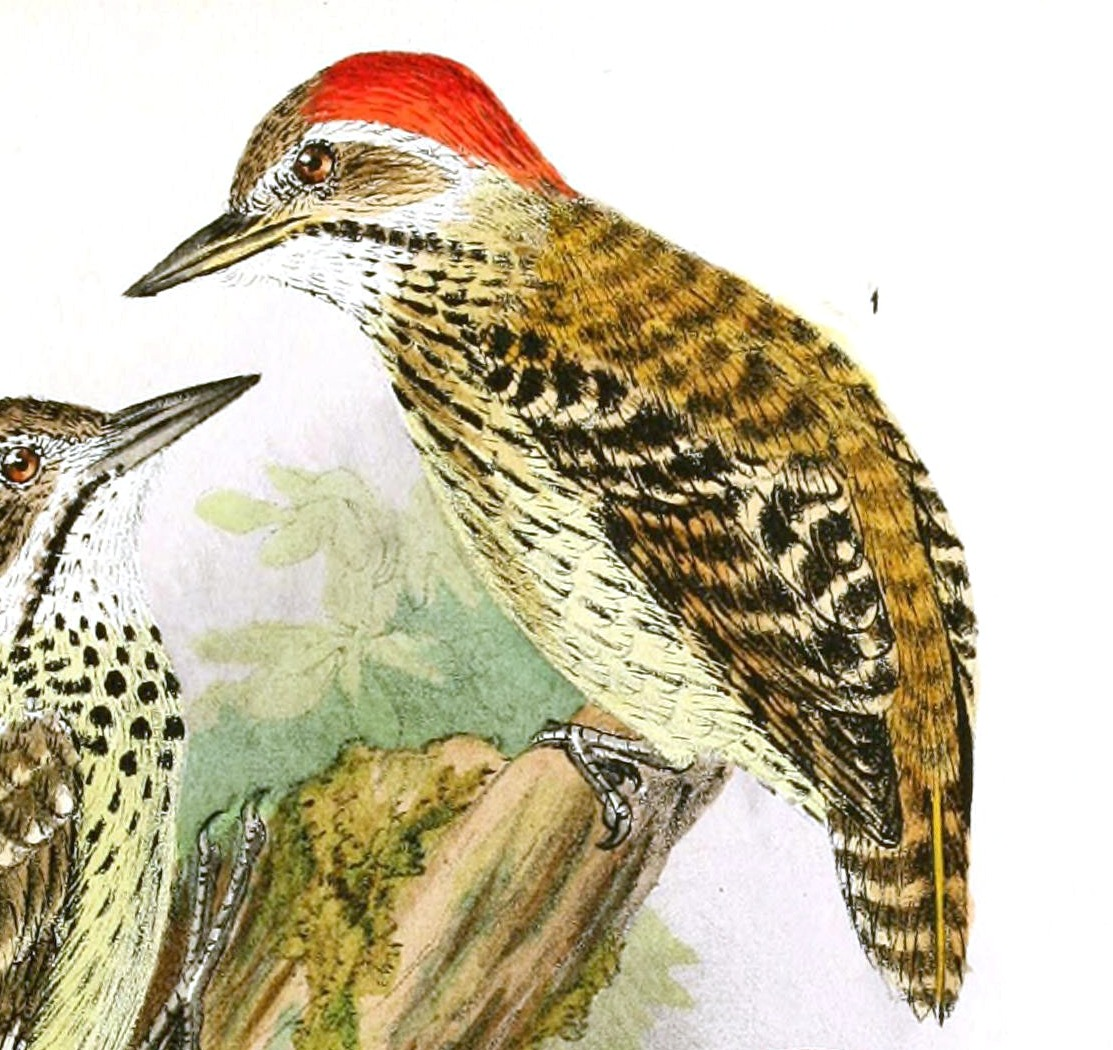
Male of the western cardinal woodpecker, D. f. lafresnayi

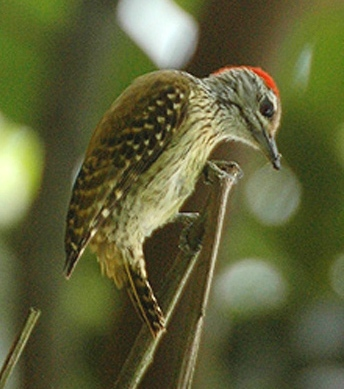
Male of D. f. lepidus which lacks barring on the mantle

== Status ==
This species has an extremely wide range and is common in much of this range. No particular threats have been recognised and the IUCN has rated its conservation status as being of "least concern".
