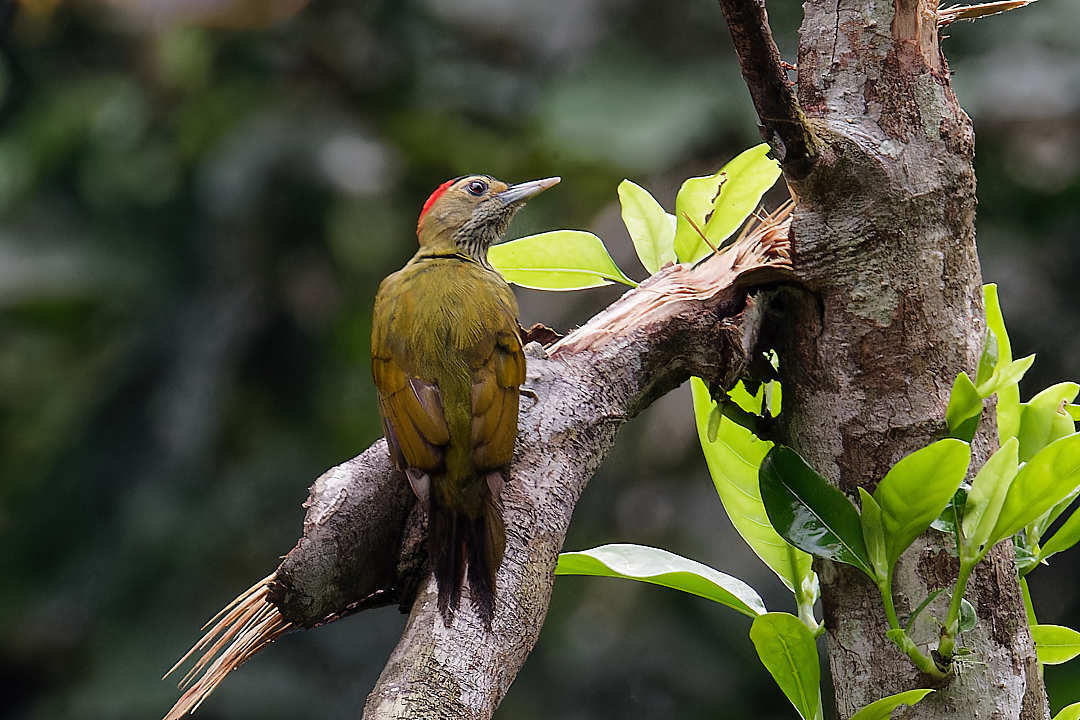

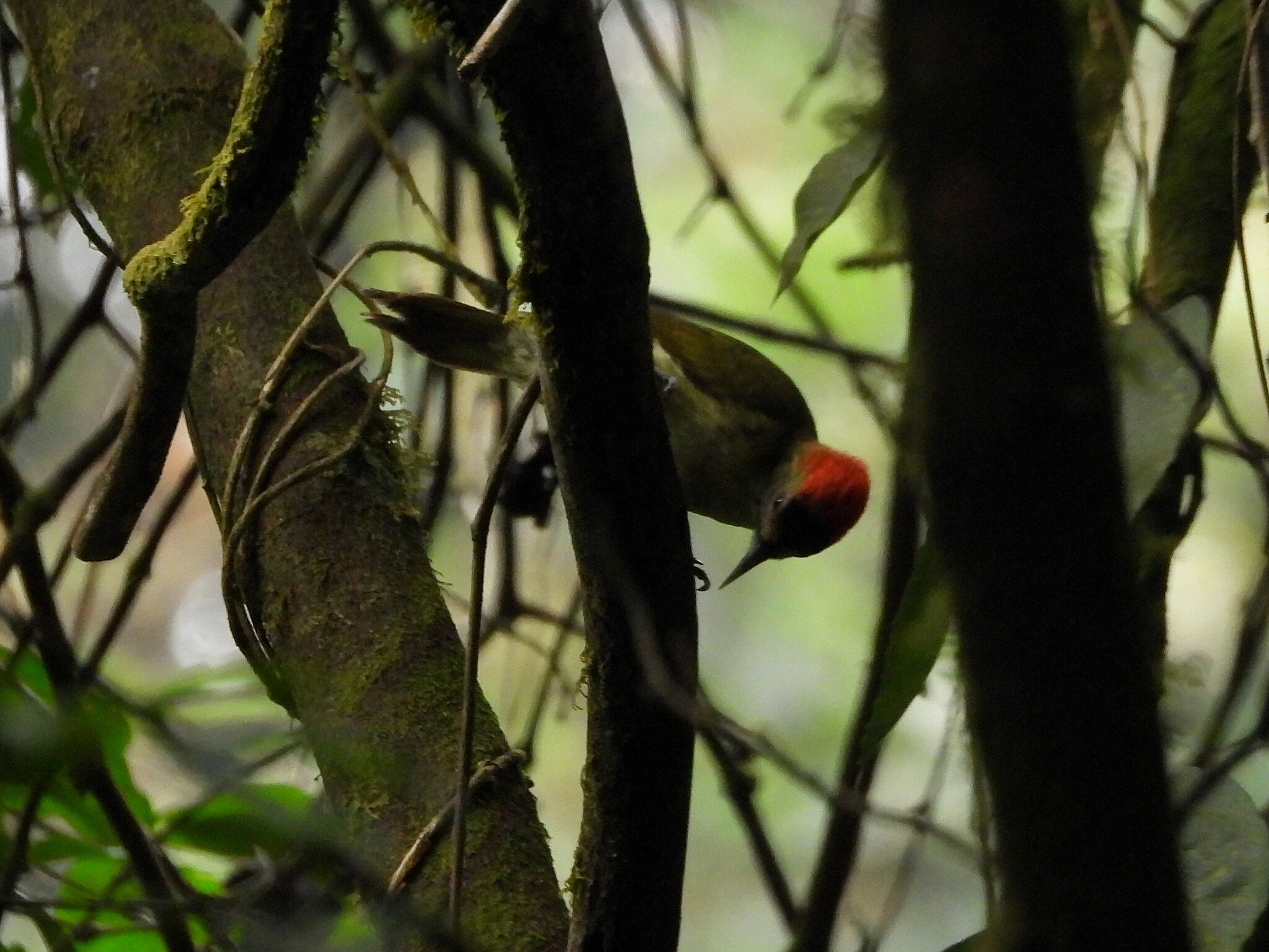

Conservation status
- Least Concern (IUCN 3.1)

Scientific classification
- Kingdom: Animalia
- Phylum: Chordata
- Class: Aves
- Order: Piciformes
- Family: Picidae
- Genus: Dendropicos
- Species: D. elliotii

Binomial name
- Dendropicos elliotii (Cassin, 1863)

Synonyms
- Chloropicus elliotii

= Elliot's woodpecker =

Species of bird

Elliot's woodpecker (Dendropicos elliotii) is a species of bird in the family Picidae. It has an extremely wide range and is described as an uncommon species. However, no particular threats to this species have been established, and the International Union for Conservation of Nature has rated its conservation status as being of "least concern".

== Description ==
Elliot's woodpecker is a medium-sized species growing to a length of between 20 and 22 cm (8 and 9 in). The face is buff with a black forehead and front part of the crown, and a white neck and throat, narrowly streaked with olive. The male has a red rear part of the crown and a red nape. The female lacks the red crown and nape, having a black crown and nape instead. Both sexes have plain green upper parts with a bronze or brownish tinge. The wings and upper side of the tail are brown, the feathers of the former having bronze-green margins, and the latter having green edges. The breast and belly are yellowish or whitish, streaked with olive, and barred with olive on the flanks.

== Distribution and habitat ==
Elliot's woodpecker is found in Angola, Cameroon, Central African Republic, Republic of the Congo, Democratic Republic of the Congo, Equatorial Guinea, Gabon, Nigeria, Rwanda, and Uganda. Its typical habitat is dense primary forest but it sometimes occurs in mature secondary growth. Although mainly a lowland bird, it occurs at altitudes of up to 2,320 m (7,600 ft) in thick, mossy montane forest.

== Ecology ==
This woodpecker is normally seen by itself or in pairs, but sometimes joins small mixed species groups. It forages in the canopy and in the lower storeys of the forest, pecking and probing deeply into mosses and other epiphytes. It explores trees briefly, soon flitting on to others. The diet is mainly insects, especially beetle larvae.
