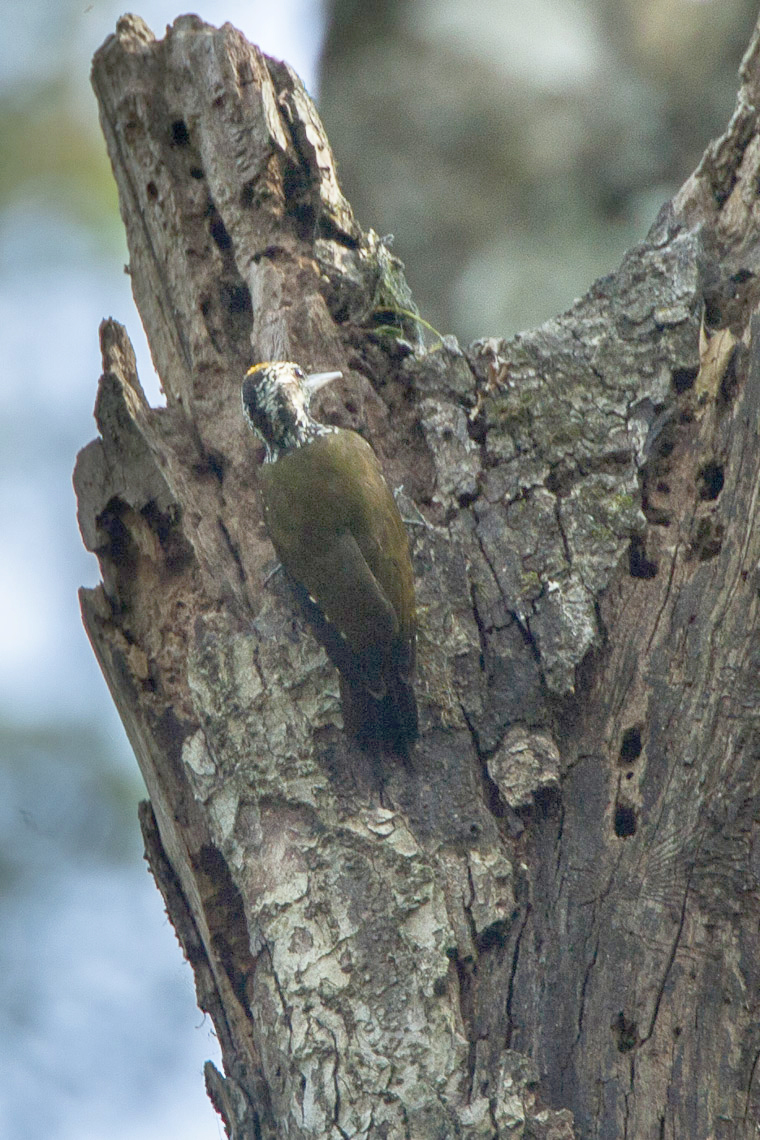

Conservation status
- Least Concern (IUCN 3.1)

Scientific classification
- Kingdom: Animalia
- Phylum: Chordata
- Class: Aves
- Order: Piciformes
- Family: Picidae
- Genus: Chloropicus
- Species: C. xantholophus

Binomial name
- Chloropicus xantholophus (Hargitt, 1883)

Synonyms
- Thripias xantholophus Dendropicos xantholophus

= Yellow-crested woodpecker =

Species of bird

The yellow-crested woodpecker (Chloropicus xantholophus), also known as the golden-crowned woodpecker, is a species of bird in the family Picidae. Some taxonomic authorities place this species in Dendropicos. Its typical habitat is wet tropical forest and it is found in Angola, Cameroon, Central African Republic, Republic of the Congo, Democratic Republic of the Congo, Gabon, Kenya, Nigeria, South Sudan, Tanzania and Uganda.

== Description ==
The yellow-crested woodpecker grows to a length of 22 to 25 cm (9 to 10 in). The male has a small golden patch with black flecking on the crown, most noticeable in display, but the female lacks this. In other respects, the sexes are similar, the forehead being brown and the cheeks and throat whitish; there is a broad black streak through the eye which extends to the sides of the neck. The nape is black and the upper parts of the body are dull brownish-olive, usually plain but sometimes slightly barred. The rump and upper tail coverts are yellowish and the tail chocolate-brown. The underparts are brown with white spotting on the breast and white barring on the flanks and lower belly. The beak is long, the upper mandible being darker than the lower one, the iris is dark red and the legs and feet are olive-grey. Juveniles are somewhat drabber, with fewer spots but more barring, and both sexes have some yellow tipped feathers in the crown.

== Distribution and habitat ==
The yellow-crested woodpecker occurs in equatorial Central and Western Africa. Its range extends from western Kenya to Nigeria and southwestern Cameroon, and southward to northwestern Angola. Its altitudinal range is from 700 to 2,150 m (2,300 to 7,100 ft). Its habitat is dense primary or secondary rainforest, as well as drier forests, forest edges, and plantations of cocoa or coffee where there are some remaining large trees.

== Ecology ==
Both male and female yellow-crested woodpeckers resort frequently to drumming; they produce loud rolls which start slowly, accelerate and finally fade away. This bird is also rather vocal, producing a range of chattering calls and various series of notes. It feeds on insects in the middle and upper parts of the canopy, chiselling into wood to find beetle larvae, levering off bark, and sometimes sallying to catch flying insects. The breeding habits of this species are poorly known, but it probably nests between September and March in Cameroon, Kenya and Uganda, and between June and September in Angola.

== Status ==
This woodpecker has an extremely wide range with a total area of occupancy of nearly 4,000,000 km^{2} (1,500,000 mi^{2}). The population is believed to be stable and the International Union for Conservation of Nature has assessed its conservation status as being of least concern.
