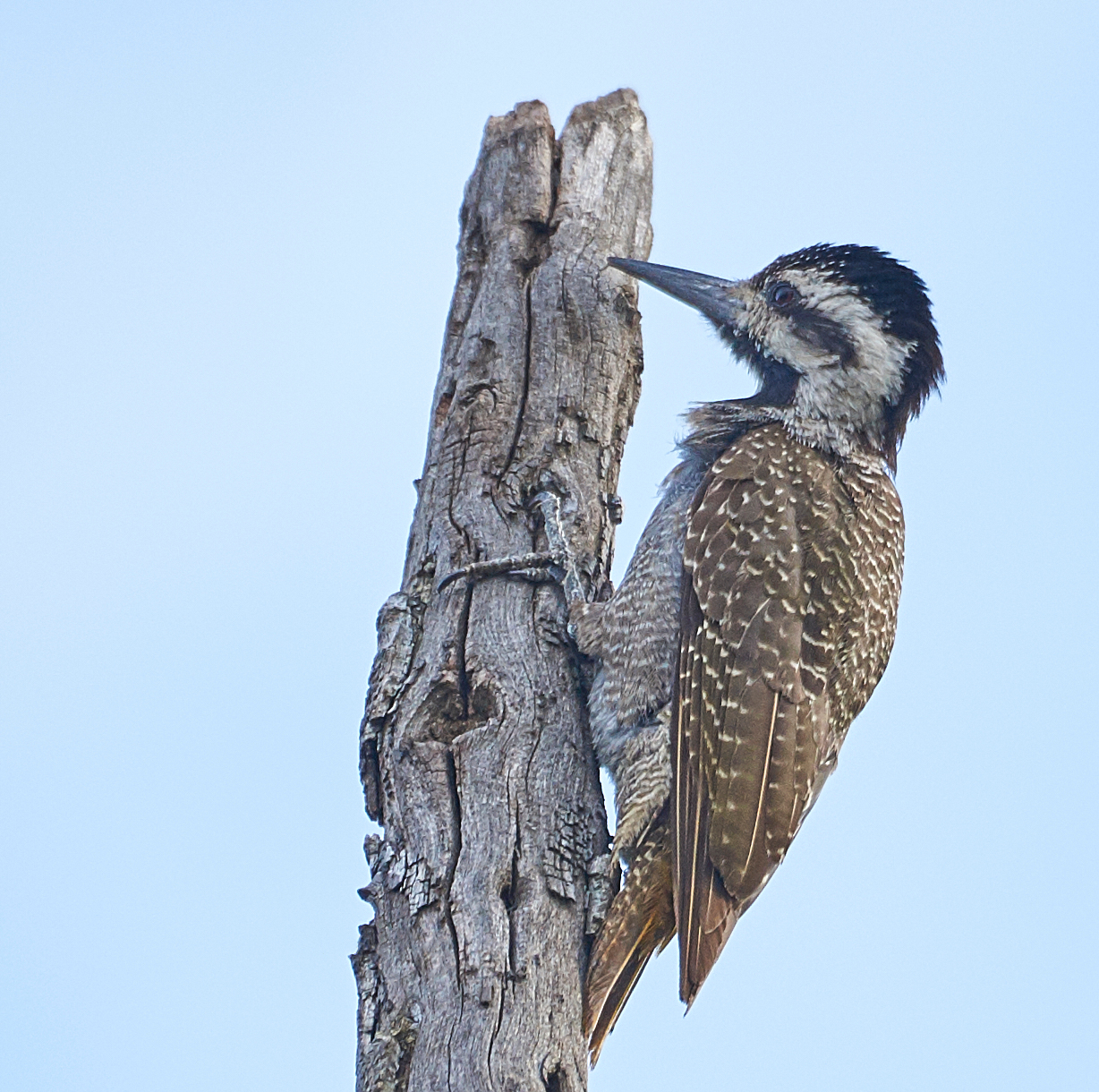
- Female at Maasai Mara, Kenya

Conservation status
- Least Concern (IUCN 3.1)

Scientific classification
- Kingdom: Animalia
- Phylum: Chordata
- Class: Aves
- Order: Piciformes
- Family: Picidae
- Genus: Chloropicus
- Species: C. namaquus

Binomial name
- Chloropicus namaquus (Lichtenstein, AAH, 1793)

Synonyms
- Thripias namaquus Dendropicos namaquus

= Bearded woodpecker =

Species of bird

The bearded woodpecker (Chloropicus namaquus) is a species of bird in the family Picidae. It has a distinctive black and white head and brownish barred body. It is native to tropical central Africa. It has an extremely wide range and is a fairly common species, and the International Union for Conservation of Nature has rated its conservation status as being of "least concern". Some taxonomic authorities place this species in Dendropicos.

== Description ==
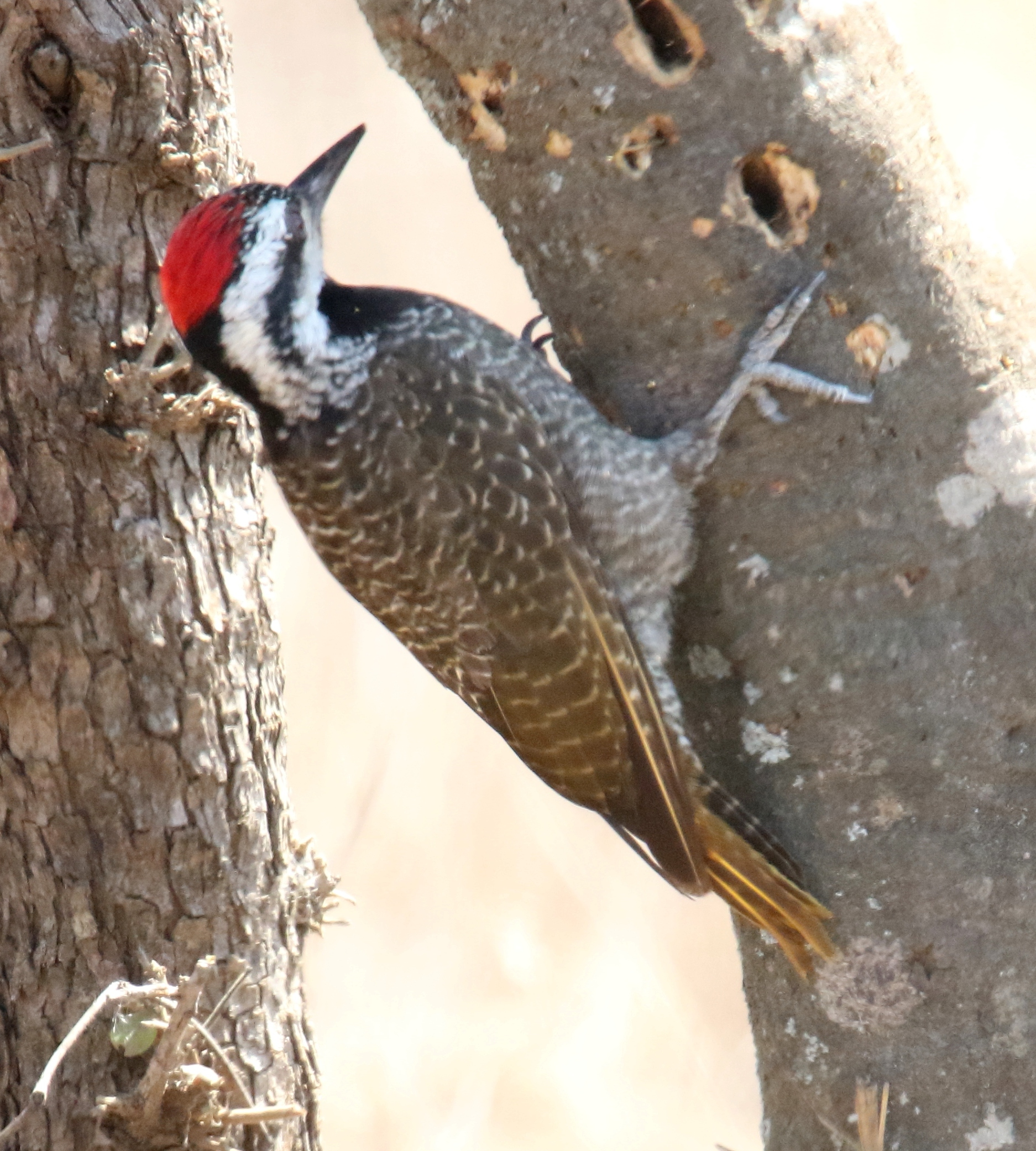
Male in Tanzania

Drumming on a utility pole, South Africa

The bearded woodpecker is one of the largest woodpeckers in Africa growing to a length of about 25 cm (10 in). The head is distinctive with a black moustache, a broad black eye-stripe and black crown contrasting with a white supercilium, face, chin and throat. The male has a red hind crown which the female lacks. The mantle is black and the rest of the upper parts are yellowish-brown with narrow white barring. The tail is brown, barred white, the feathers having yellowish shafts. The underparts are grey with narrow white barring. The beak is large and greyish-black, the legs grey and the eyes red. Juveniles are similar to adults but the upper parts have a greenish tinge and more diffuse barring, and both sexes have some red colouring on the crown and nape.

== Distribution and habitat ==
It is found in Angola, Botswana, Central African Republic, Chad, Democratic Republic of the Congo, Eswatini, Ethiopia, Kenya, Malawi, Mozambique, Namibia, Rwanda, Somalia, South Africa, Sudan, Tanzania, Uganda, Zambia, and Zimbabwe. It has a wide range of habitat types including woodland with sizeable trees, Brachystegia woodland, Euphorbia and Acacia woodland, the fringes of gallery forests and brushland. It is present from the lowlands up to altitudes of about 3,000 m (10,000 ft).

== Ecology ==
The bearded woodpecker often forages in pairs which communicate with each other vocally, flicking their wings as they call. Each bird will spend a long time on a single tree, hammering, probing and pecking with its beak and gleaning any stray insects it encounters, before flying off to another, often distant, tree. The diet consists of insects and their larvae, spiders, caterpillars and ants. It has been known to catch geckos and small lizards. This bird often drums loudly on branches, finishing each drum-roll with four taps. The nest hole is drilled in dead wood, up to 20 m (70 ft) above the ground. A clutch averaging three eggs is laid and incubation, by both parents, lasts thirteen days. The chicks are cared for by both birds and remain in the nest for about four weeks.
