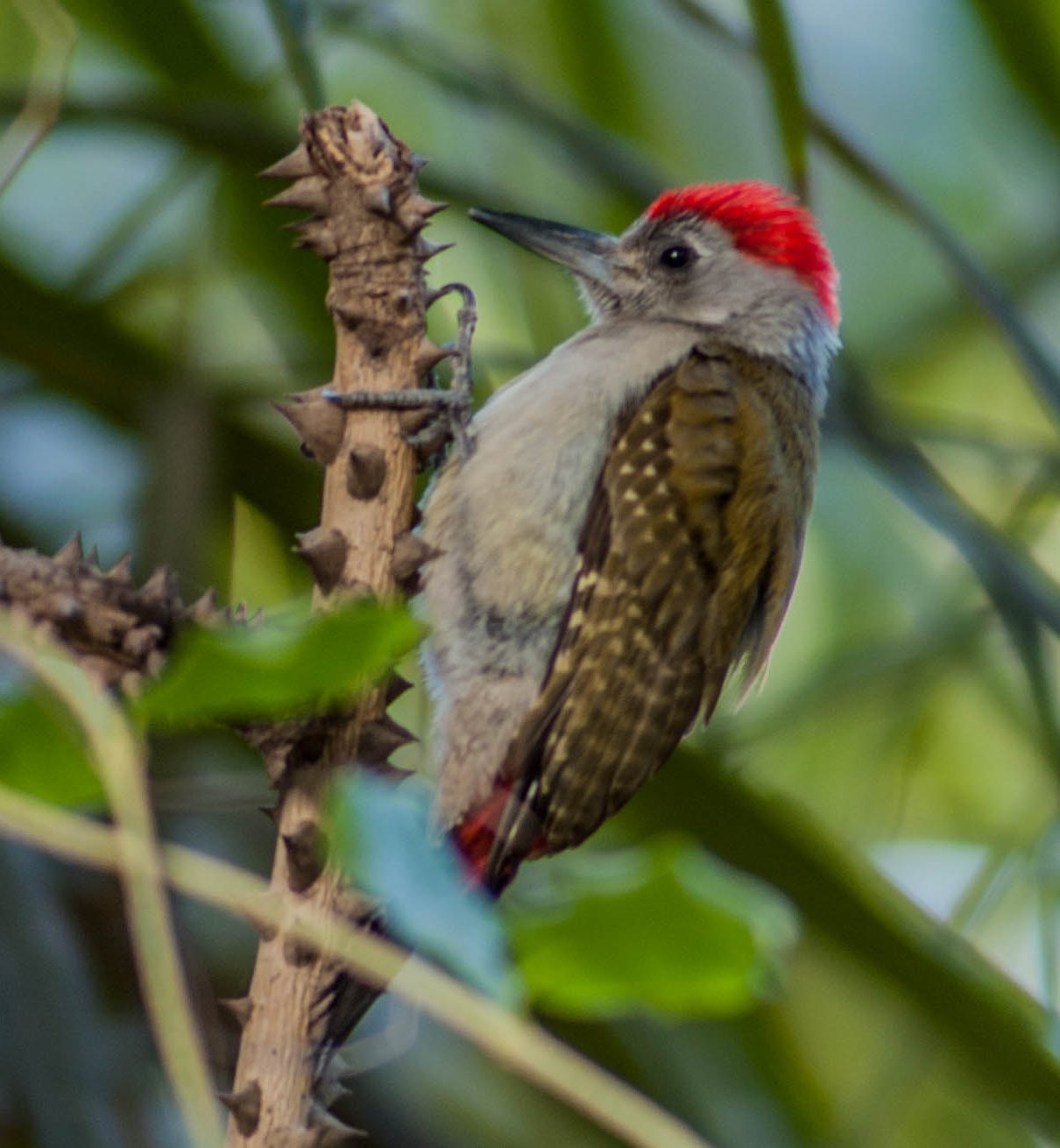

Conservation status
- Least Concern (IUCN 3.1)

Scientific classification
- Kingdom: Animalia
- Phylum: Chordata
- Class: Aves
- Order: Piciformes
- Family: Picidae
- Genus: Dendropicos
- Species: D. goertae

Binomial name
- Dendropicos goertae (Müller, PLS, 1776)
- Geographic distribution shown in green

Synonyms
- Picus goertae; Chloropicus goertae; Mesopicus goertae

= African grey woodpecker =

Species of bird

The African grey woodpecker (Dendropicos goertae) is a species of bird in the woodpecker family Picidae. Is a widespread and frequently common resident breeder in much of Sub-Saharan and equatorial Africa. It is a species associated with forest and bush which nests in a tree hole, often in an oil palm, laying two to four eggs. It is a common bird with a very wide range, and the International Union for Conservation of Nature has rated its conservation status as being of "least concern".

== Taxonomy ==
The African grey woodpecker was described by the German zoologist Philipp Ludwig Statius Müller in 1776 from a specimen collected in Senegal. He coined the binomial name Picus goertae. The specific epithet is from the French polymath Comte de Buffon who noted that "Goërtan" was the name used for the species in Senegal. The species was also illustrated in a set of plates that accompanied Brisson's work. The African grey woodpecker is now placed in the genus Dendropicos that was introduced by the French ornithologist Alfred Malherbe in 1849.

Five subspecies are recognised:

- D. g. koenigi (Neumann, 1903) – Mali to west Sudan
- D. g. abessinicus (Reichenow, 1900) – east Sudan to west Ethiopia
- D. g. goertae (Müller, PLS, 1776) – Senegal and Gambia to Mali.
- D. g. centralis (Reichenow, 1900) – Sierra Leone to Nigeria, south Sudan, west Kenya and northwest Tanzania
- D. g. meridionalis Louette & Prigogine, 1982 – south Gabon and northwest Angola to south central Democratic Republic of the Congo

The African grey woodpecker and the eastern grey woodpecker (Picidae spodocephalus) were formerly treated as conspecific.

== Description ==
Like other woodpeckers, this species has a straight pointed bill, a stiff tail to provide support against tree trunks, and zygodactyl or "yoked" feet, with two toes pointing forward, and two backward. The long tongue can be darted forward to capture insects. This bird is 20 cm (7.9 in) in length. It is a typical woodpecker shape, and has unmarked green upperparts and a pale grey head and underparts. The rump is red, and there is a small red belly patch. The short tail is blackish. The adult male grey woodpecker has a red crown. Females have a plain grey head, lacking the red crown. Young birds are like the female, but the reds are paler, and there may be some flank barring.

== Distribution and habitat ==
The African grey woodpecker is native to tropical parts of western and central Africa. Its range includes Angola, Benin, Burkina Faso, Burundi, Cameroon, Central African Republic, Chad, Congo, Democratic Republic of Congo, Equatorial Guinea, Eritrea, Ethiopia, Gabon, Gambia, Ghana, Guinea, Guinea-Bissau, Ivory Coast, Kenya, Liberia, Mali, Mauritania, Niger, Nigeria, Rwanda, Senegal, Sierra Leone, South Sudan, Sudan, Tanzania, Togo and Uganda. Its typical habitat includes woodland, savannah with isolated trees, copses of larger trees, riverside forest and pasture.

== Behaviour and ecology ==
Like other woodpeckers, this species is an insectivore. It is frequently seen, and regularly taps or drums. The call is a loud and fast peet-peet-peet-peet.
