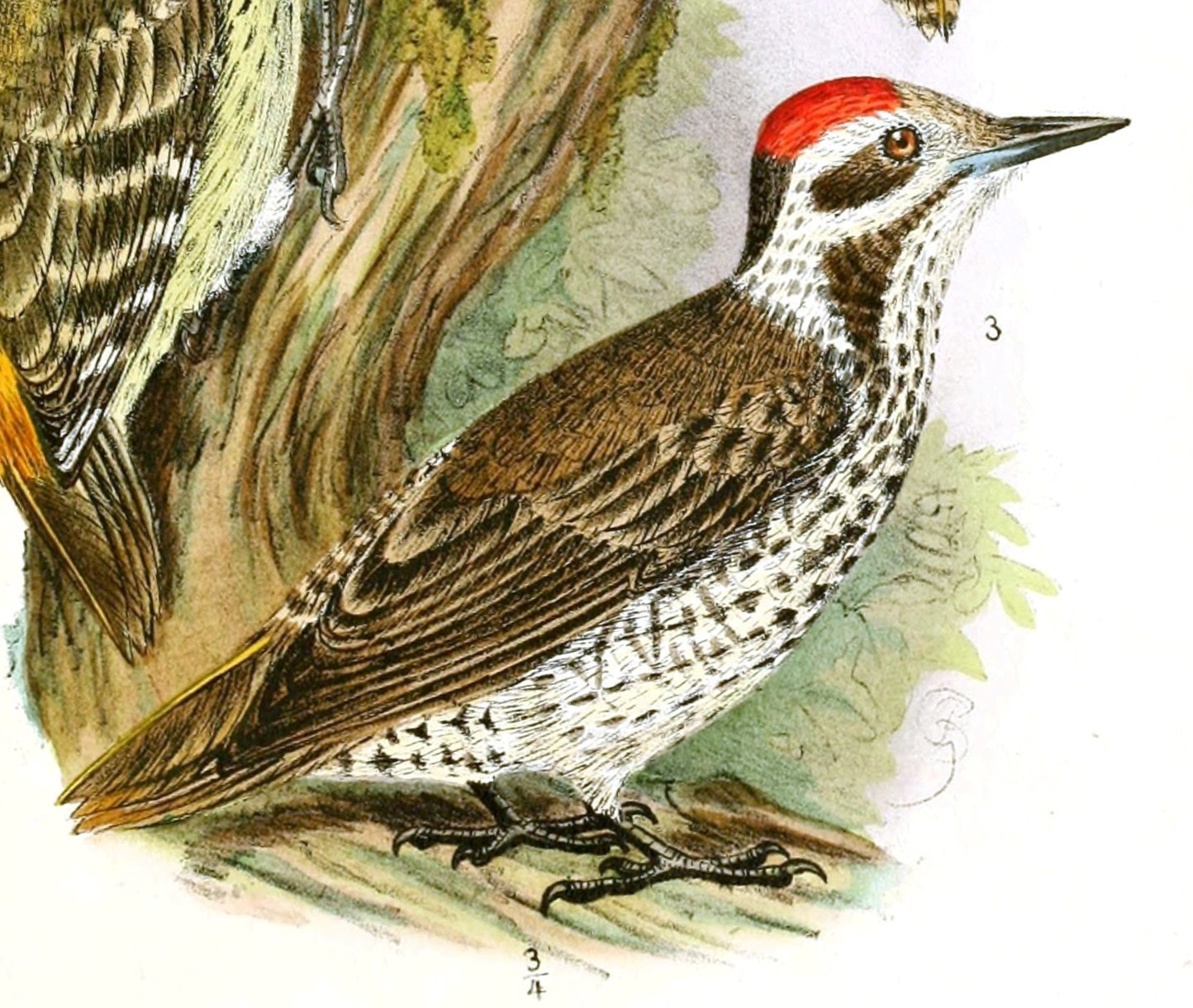
- Illustration of male, female has black crown
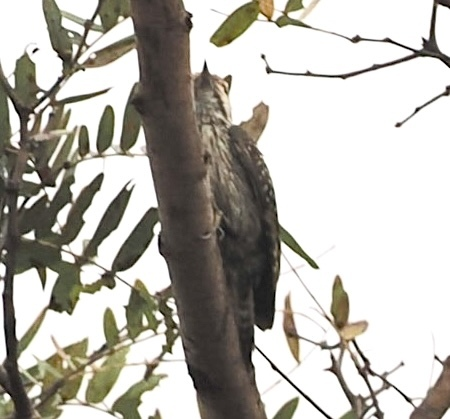

Conservation status
- Near Threatened (IUCN 3.1)

Scientific classification
- Kingdom: Animalia
- Phylum: Chordata
- Class: Aves
- Order: Piciformes
- Family: Picidae
- Genus: Dendropicos
- Species: D. stierlingi

Binomial name
- Dendropicos stierlingi Reichenow, 1901

Synonyms
- Chloropicus stierlingi

= Stierling's woodpecker =

Species of bird

Stierling's woodpecker (Dendropicos stierlingi) is a species of bird in the family Picidae. It is native to Malawi, Mozambique, and Tanzania where its natural habitat is tropical dry forests in the Eastern miombo woodlands ecoregion. It is threatened by habitat destruction. The bird is named in honour of the German bird collector N. Stierling.

== Description ==
This woodpecker grows to a length of about 17.5 cm (7 in). The sexes are different, being distinguished by the male having a red mid-crown and nape and the female having a brown crown with pale streaks and a black nape. The upper parts of both sexes are plain olive brown and the underparts white or cream with brown markings. The face, neck, chin and throat are white. A brown band extends from the eye across the ear coverts, and a brown malar streak extends to the breast. The wings are brown above and white below, and the tail is brown with a buff tip and pale underside. The beak is grey with a paler base, the legs are grey or olive and the iris of the eye reddish.

== Distribution and habitat ==
The species is endemic to southeastern Africa, its range including southern Tanzania, southwestern Malawi and northern Mozambique. It is a resident species inhabiting open miombo woodland but avoiding dense forest. It is found at elevations of up to 1,500 m (5,000 ft).

== Ecology ==
Stierling's woodpecker forages for insects, centipedes and other invertebrates in the middle and upper parts of the canopy. It mostly searches on branches between 4 and 12 cm (1.6 and 4.7 in) in diameter; this may prevent undue competition between it and the cardinal woodpecker (D. fuscescens), which forages mainly on smaller branches and twigs. It sometimes flies into the air to catch winged termites, but it is less adept at this than are some other species of woodpecker. Breeding is thought to take place between July and October, the nest being made in a hole in a tree.

== Status ==
D. stierlingi has a rather limited range and is patchily distributed, being a generally uncommon species. The miombo woodland in which it lives is increasingly being cleared for firewood, especially in areas of tobacco cultivation, where open fires are used for drying the crop. As suitable habitat shrinks, it is dependent on remnants of the woodland and on forest reserves, and the International Union for Conservation of Nature has assessed its conservation status as being "near-threatened".
