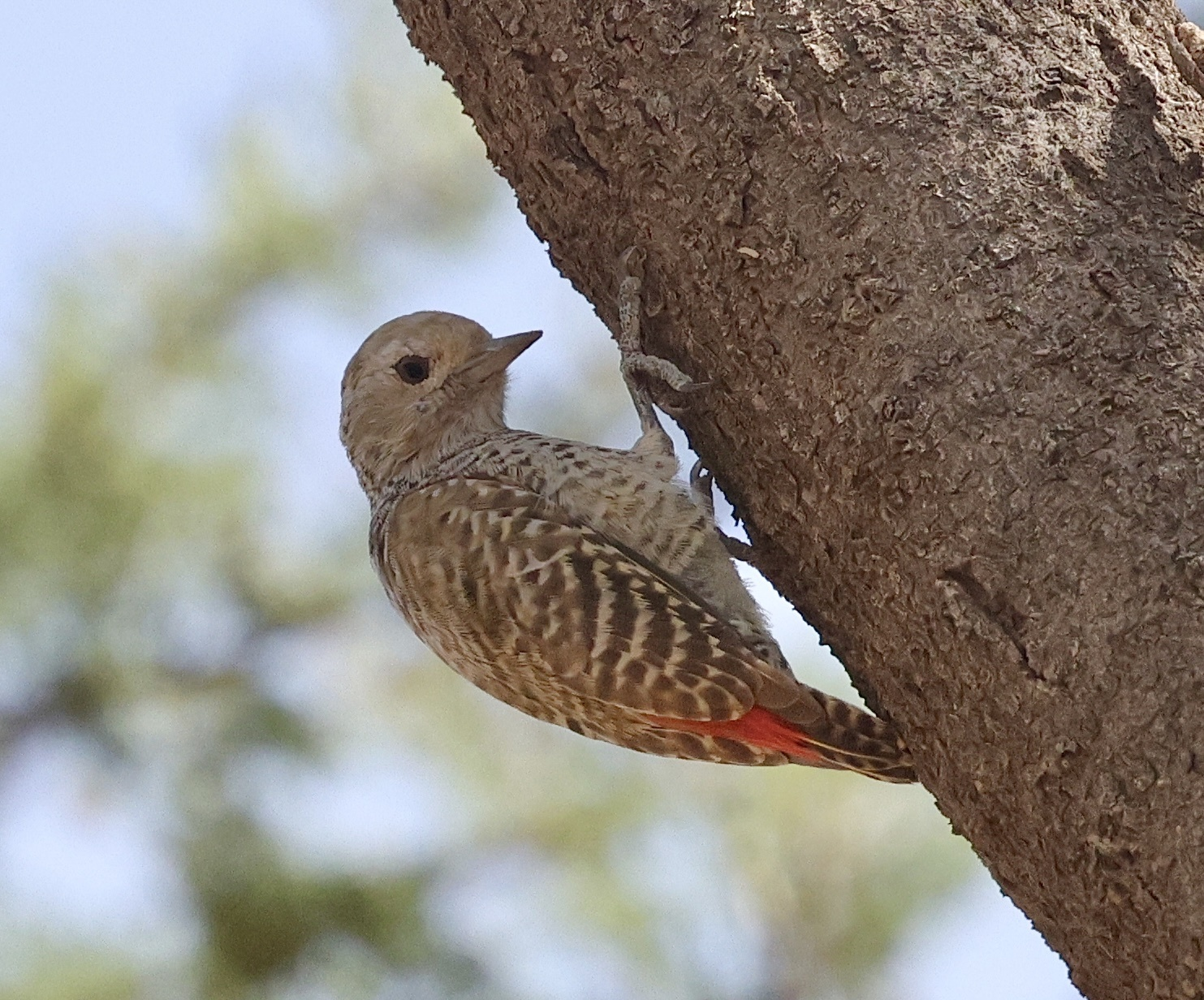

Conservation status
- Least Concern (IUCN 3.1)

Scientific classification
- Kingdom: Animalia
- Phylum: Chordata
- Class: Aves
- Order: Piciformes
- Family: Picidae
- Genus: Dendropicos
- Species: D. elachus

Binomial name
- Dendropicos elachus Oberholser, 1919
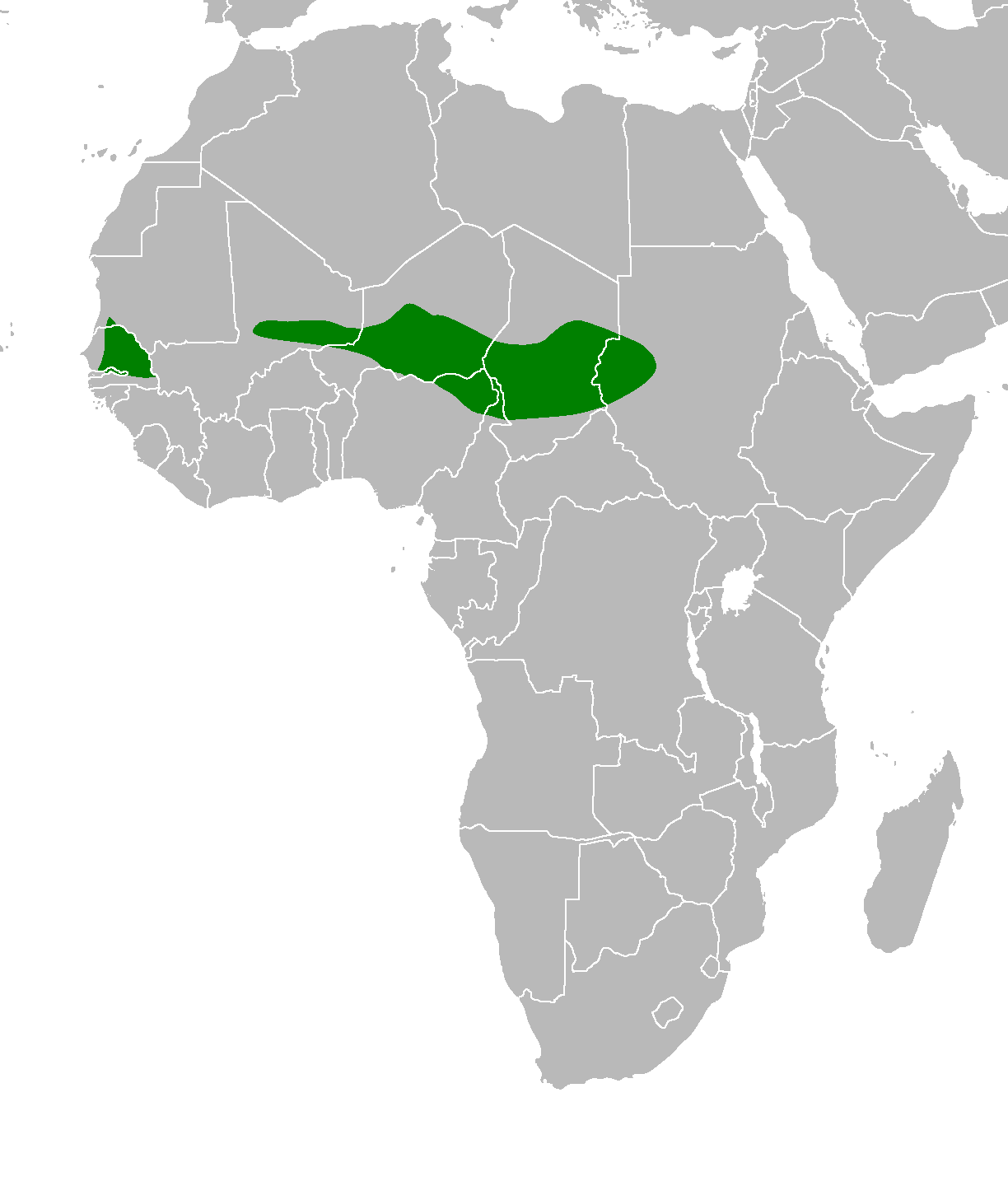
- resident range

Synonyms
- Chloropicus elachus

= Little grey woodpecker =

Species of bird

The little grey woodpecker (Dendropicos elachus), also known as the Sahelian woodpecker, is a species of bird in the family Picidae. It is found in Cameroon, Chad, Gambia, Mali, Mauritania, Niger, Nigeria, Senegal, and Sudan. This species is described as somewhat rare, but it has a very large range and the population appears to be steady, so the International Union for Conservation of Nature has rated its conservation status as being of "least concern".

== Description ==
The little grey woodpecker is a very small woodpecker, growing to a length of between 12 and 14 cm (4.7 and 5.5 in). The beak is relatively long and broad. The male has a red hind crown and nape while the female lacks these. Otherwise the sexes are similar. The head is brown with a slight white supercilium and a narrow darker brown moustachial stripe. The upper parts of the body are greyish-brown barred with white and so are the wings and tail. The rump and upper tail coverts are red, which is particularly noticeable in flight. The beak is grey, the feet greenish-grey and the eye brown. Juveniles resemble adults but the general effect is duller. The plumage of the little grey woodpecker, especially the facial features, fade very rapidly and this bird can be confused with the brown-backed woodpecker (Dendropicos obsoletus). However, that species has a more distinctly contrasting brown and white head and plain brown plumage, and lacks the red rump.

== Ecology ==
Little is known about the ecology of this species. Its typical habitat is steppe with scattered trees, wadis and dry stream beds. It feeds in trees such as Acacia and Balanites by pecking and hammering to obtain insects. Breeding has been observed between October and May in different parts of its range. A nest has been observed in the branch of an Acacia.
