= Hlabeni =

- Location within KwaZulu-Natal Location within South Africa
- Coordinates: 29.973°S 29.715°E
- Country: South Africa
- Province: KwaZulu-Natal
- District: Harry Gwala
- Municipality: Dr Nkosazana Dlamini-Zuma

Area
  - Total: 5.87 km^{2} (2.27 sq mi)

Population (2011)
  - Total: 1,323
  - Density: 225/km^{2} (584/sq mi)

Racial makeup (2011)
  - Black African: 99.2%
  - Coloured: 0.1%
  - Indian/Asian: 0.1%
  - Other: 0.7%

First languages (2011)
  - Zulu: 98.0%
  - Other: 2.0%
- Time zone: UTC+2 (SAST)

Hlabeni is a town in Harry Gwala District Municipality in the KwaZulu-Natal province of South Africa.

Flat-topped hill some 12 km north-west of Creighton. The name, also applied to the region east and north-east of the hill, to a forest, a river and a mission station, is Zulu and means ‘at the aloes’.
