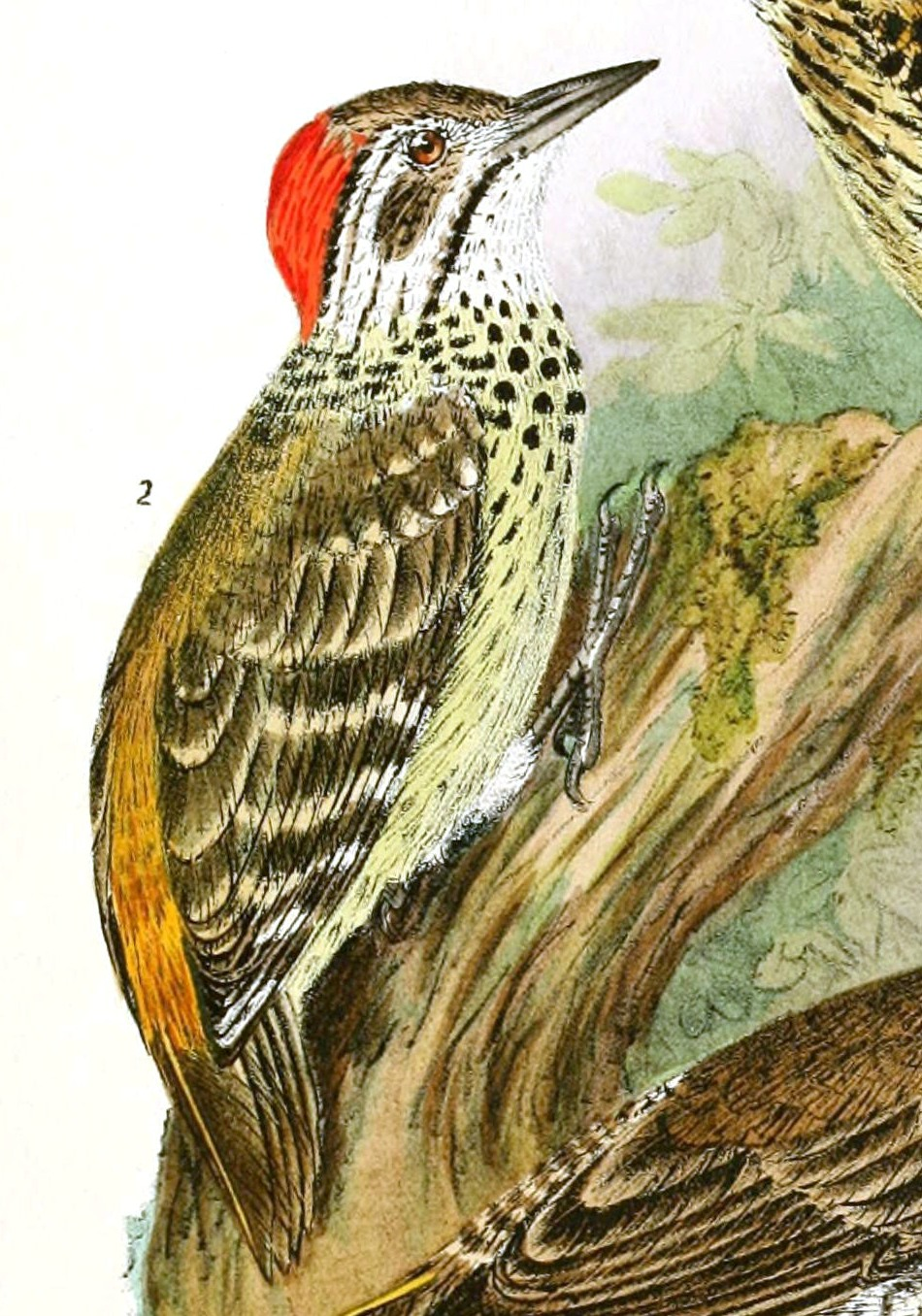
- Illustration of male
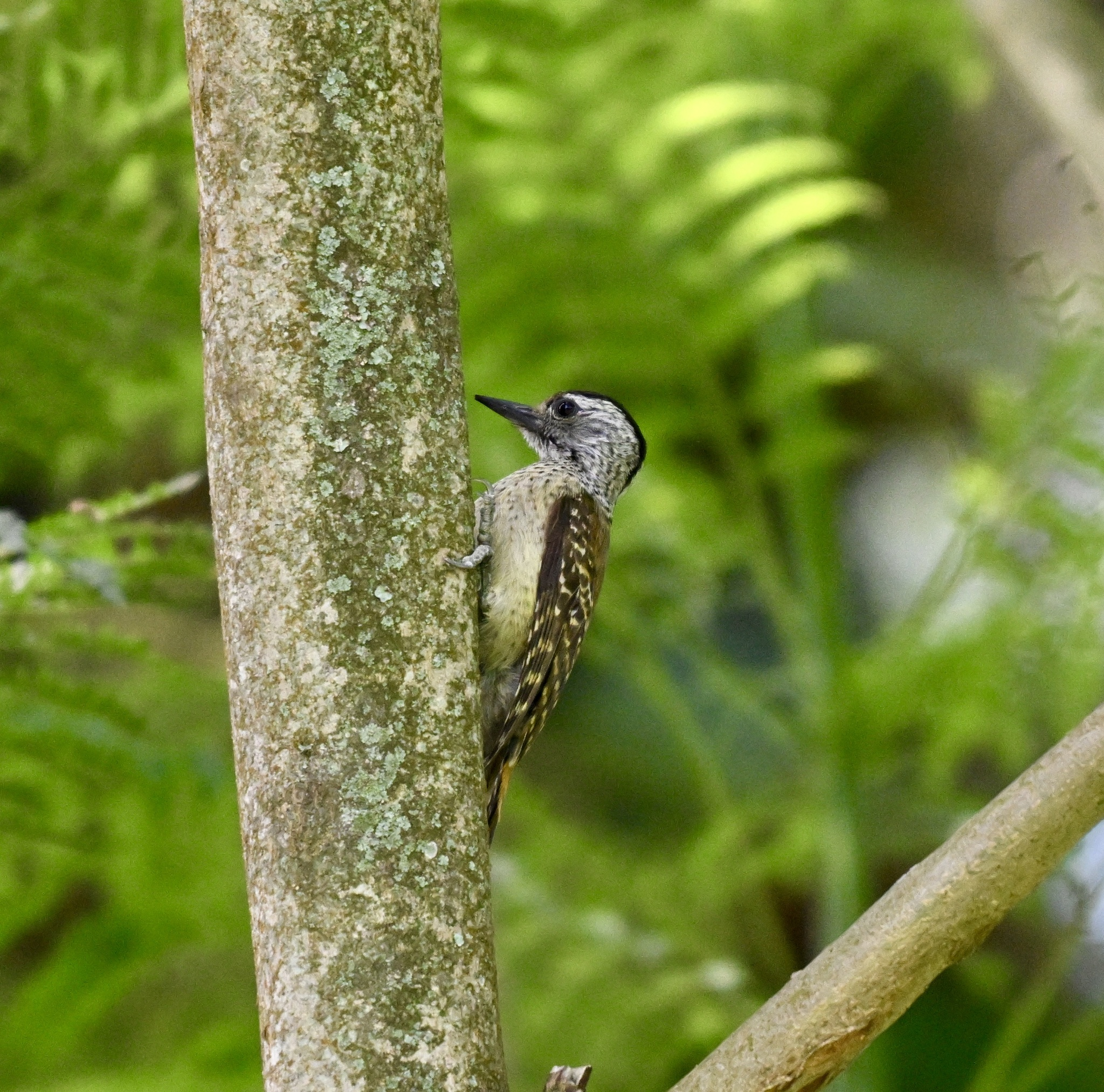
- Female

Conservation status
- Least Concern (IUCN 3.1)

Scientific classification
- Kingdom: Animalia
- Phylum: Chordata
- Class: Aves
- Order: Piciformes
- Family: Picidae
- Genus: Dendropicos
- Species: D. poecilolaemus

Binomial name
- Dendropicos poecilolaemus Reichenow, 1893

Synonyms
- Chloropicus poecilolaemus

= Speckle-breasted woodpecker =

Species of bird

The speckle-breasted woodpecker (Dendropicos poecilolaemus) is a species of bird in the family Picidae, which is native to sub-Saharan Africa.

== Range ==
It is found in Cameroon, Central African Republic, Chad, DRC, Kenya, Nigeria, Rwanda, South Sudan, and Uganda.
