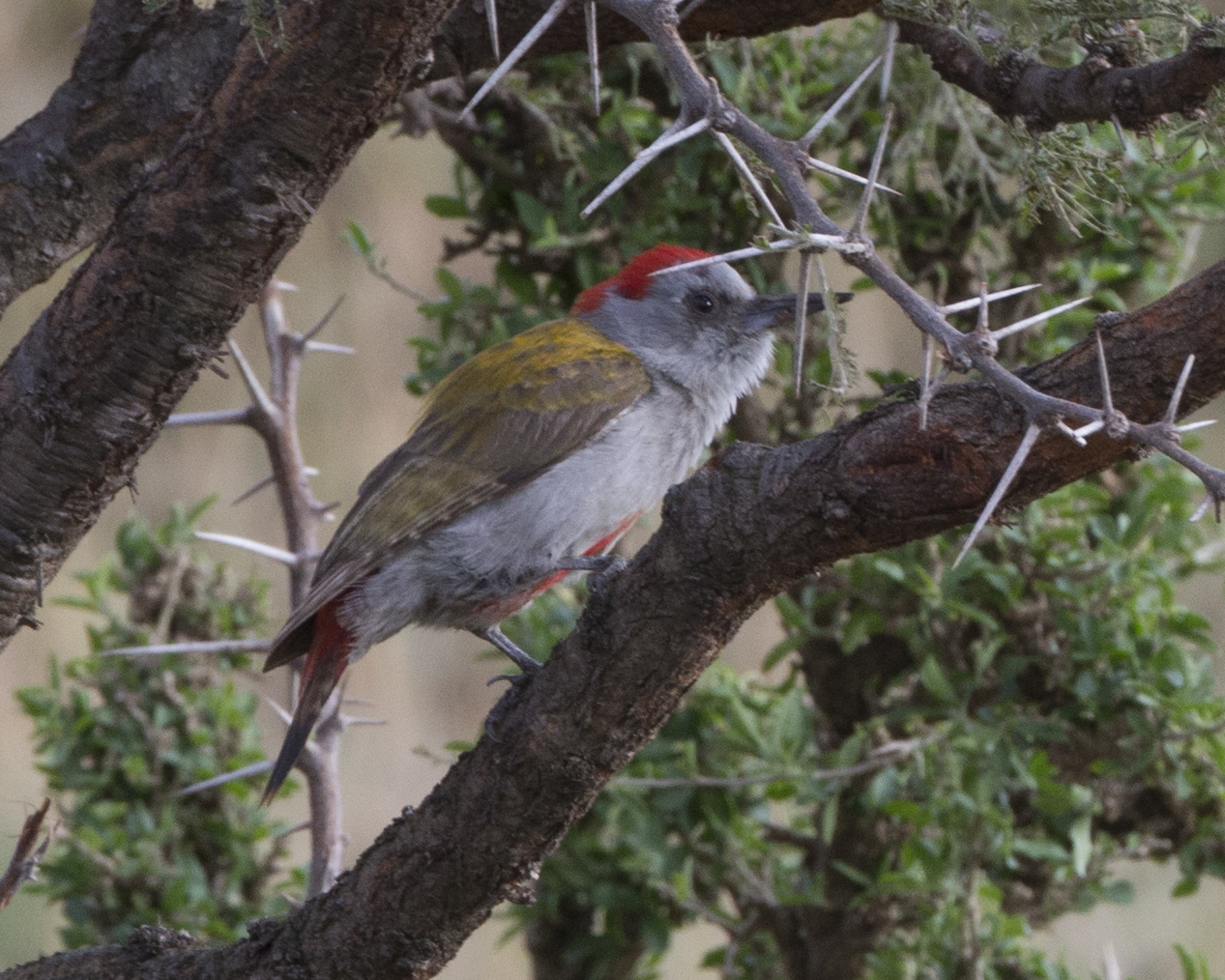

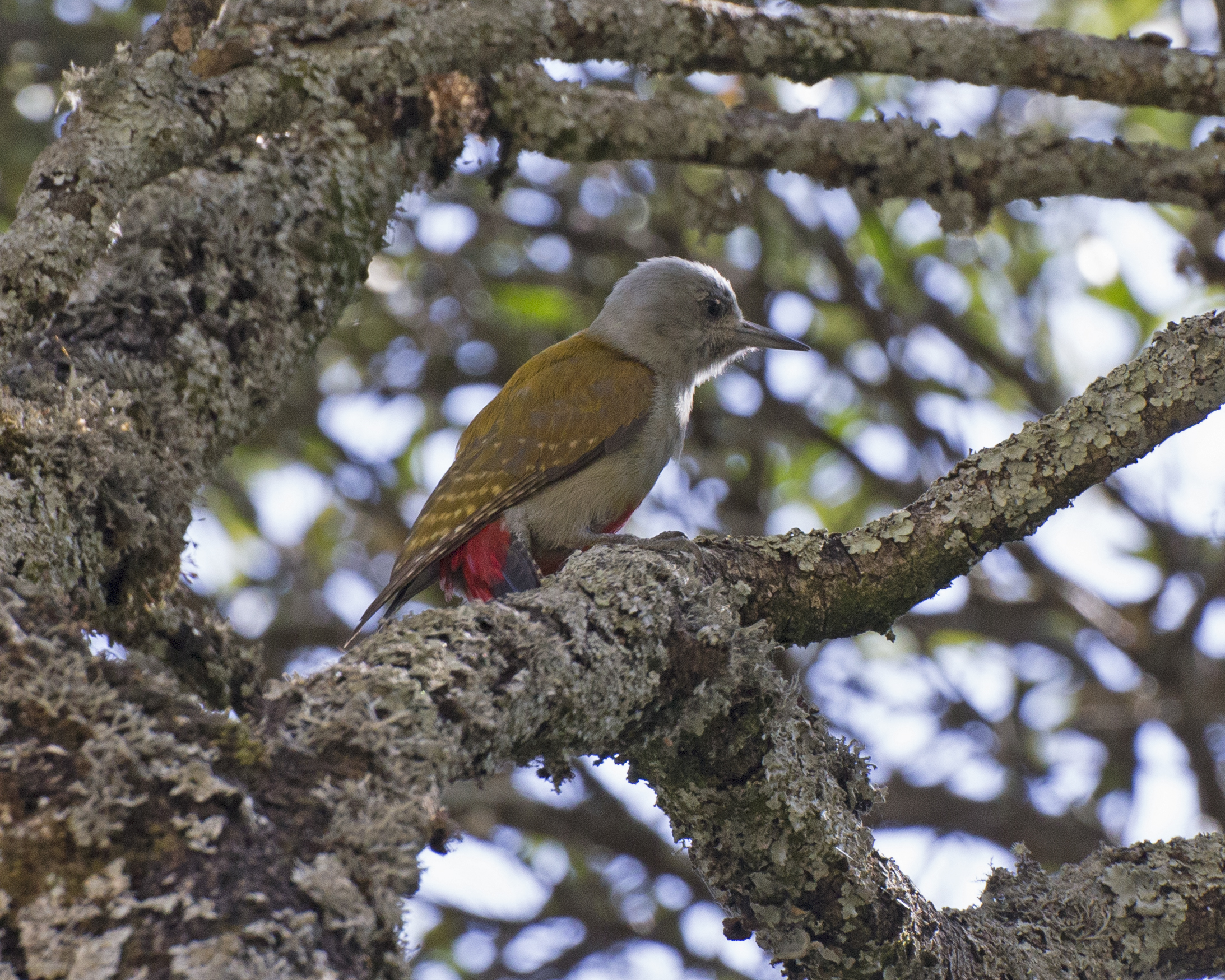
- male and female

Conservation status
- Least Concern (IUCN 3.1)

Scientific classification
- Kingdom: Animalia
- Phylum: Chordata
- Class: Aves
- Order: Piciformes
- Family: Picidae
- Genus: Dendropicos
- Species: D. spodocephalus

Binomial name
- Dendropicos spodocephalus (Bonaparte, 1850)

Synonyms
- Chloropicus spodocephalus

= Eastern grey woodpecker =

Species of bird

The eastern grey woodpecker (Dendropicos spodocephalus), also known as grey-headed woodpecker and mountain gray woodpecker, is a species of bird in the woodpecker family Picidae. It is a resident breeder in eastern Africa. It has a large range and is a fairly common species. No special threats have been recognised and the International Union for Conservation of Nature has rated the bird's conservation status as being of "least concern".

== Description ==
Like other woodpeckers, this species has a straight pointed bill, a stiff tail to provide support against tree trunks, and zygodactyl or "yoked" feet, with two toes pointing forward, and two backward. The long tongue can be darted forward to capture insects. The adult male eastern grey woodpecker has a red crown and nape, and females have a plain grey head, lacking the red crown. The upper parts of the body are yellowish-green, the rump is red, and the wings and tail are dark brown. The remaining parts of the head and the underparts are pale grey, apart from a reddish patch on the hinder part of the belly. The beak is dark grey or black, the legs are greenish-grey and the eyes red to brown. Young birds are similar to the female, but the reds are paler, and there may be some barring on the flanks and some red on the crown in both sexes.

== Distribution and habitat ==
The eastern grey woodpecker is a native of tropical eastern Africa, its range including Ethiopia, Kenya, South Sudan, Sudan and Tanzania. Its habitat is humid forests, forest verges and gallery forests. It is found in the lowlands and at altitudes of up to 3,300 m (10,800 ft).

== Ecology ==
Like other woodpeckers, this species is an insectivore, and forages on trees and on the ground for moths, centipedes, larvae and pupae. It is frequently seen, and regularly taps or drums. This species and the African grey woodpecker were formerly considered conspecific.
