= Alfred Malherbe =

French magistrate and amateur naturalist

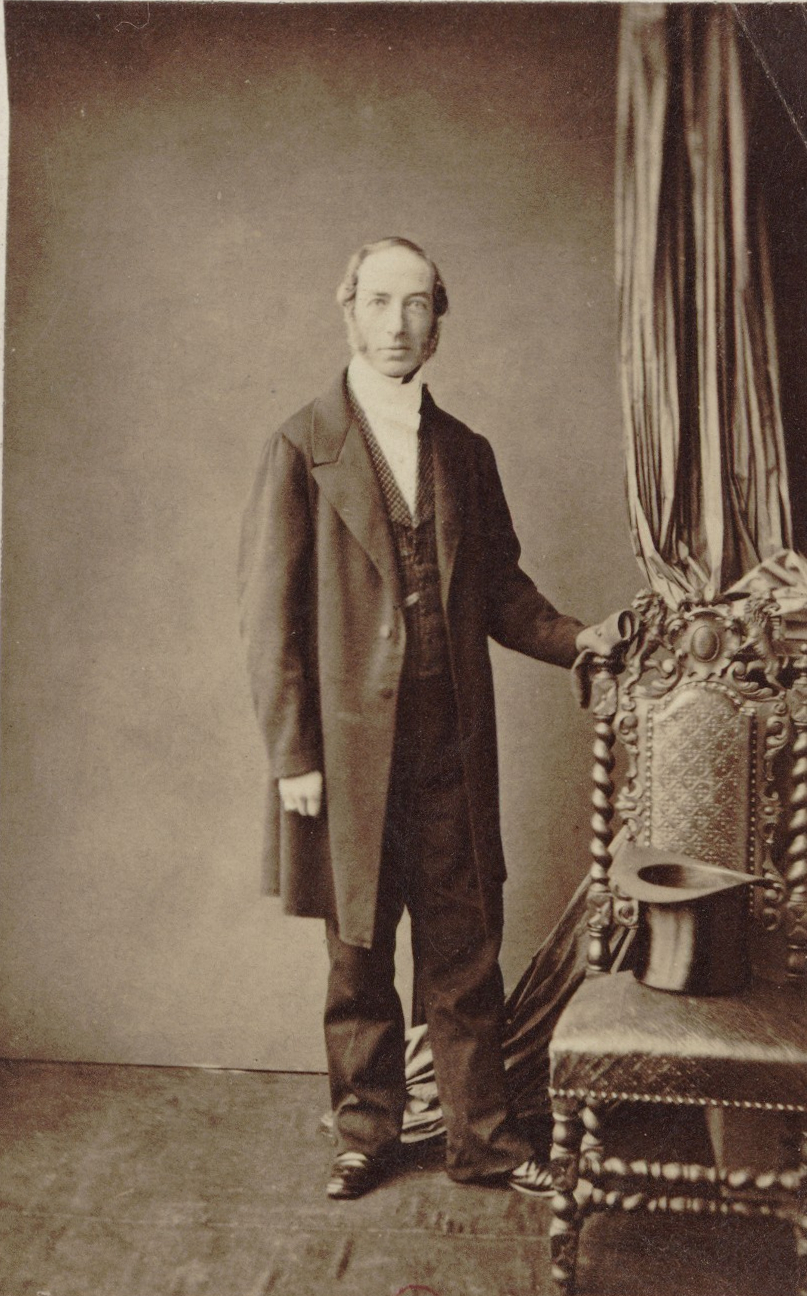
A portrait in the Bibliothèque nationale de France

Alfred Malherbe (14 July 1804 – 14 August 1865) was a French magistrate and amateur naturalist born in Mauritius to Pierre Marie François Malherbe and Rosalie Le Meusnier Molineuf. The family originally came from Metz. Alfred became the administrator of the Museum of Metz (being its director until 1863).

He devoted his spare time to botany and zoology (especially ornithology). He conducted studies of birds of Algeria (describing numerous species) and Sicily.

Malherbe was the author of Monographie des picidées (1859–62, 4 vols.), the first global survey of the woodpeckers. He described and named Levaillant's woodpecker, after French ornithologist François Le Vaillant. In addition to Monographie des picidées, he was the author of several other ornithological works:

- Faune ornithologique de la Sicile : avec des observations sur l'habitat ou l'apparition des oiseaux de cette île, etc. (1843) - Ornithological fauna of Sicily.
- Description de dix espéces nouvelles du genre Picus, Linné., (1845) - Description of ten new species from the genus Picus.
- Faune ornithologique de l'Algérie (1855) - Ornithological fauna of Algeria.

Parts of his collections of birds from Algeria and Europe were donated to the Asiatic Society of Bengal in Calcutta. The main collections were acquired by Hercules Turati and then gifted to the natural history museum at Milan.

== See also ==
- Aloinopsis malherbei, a succulent named in his honour
- Malherbe's parakeet, a New Zealand bird named in his honour
