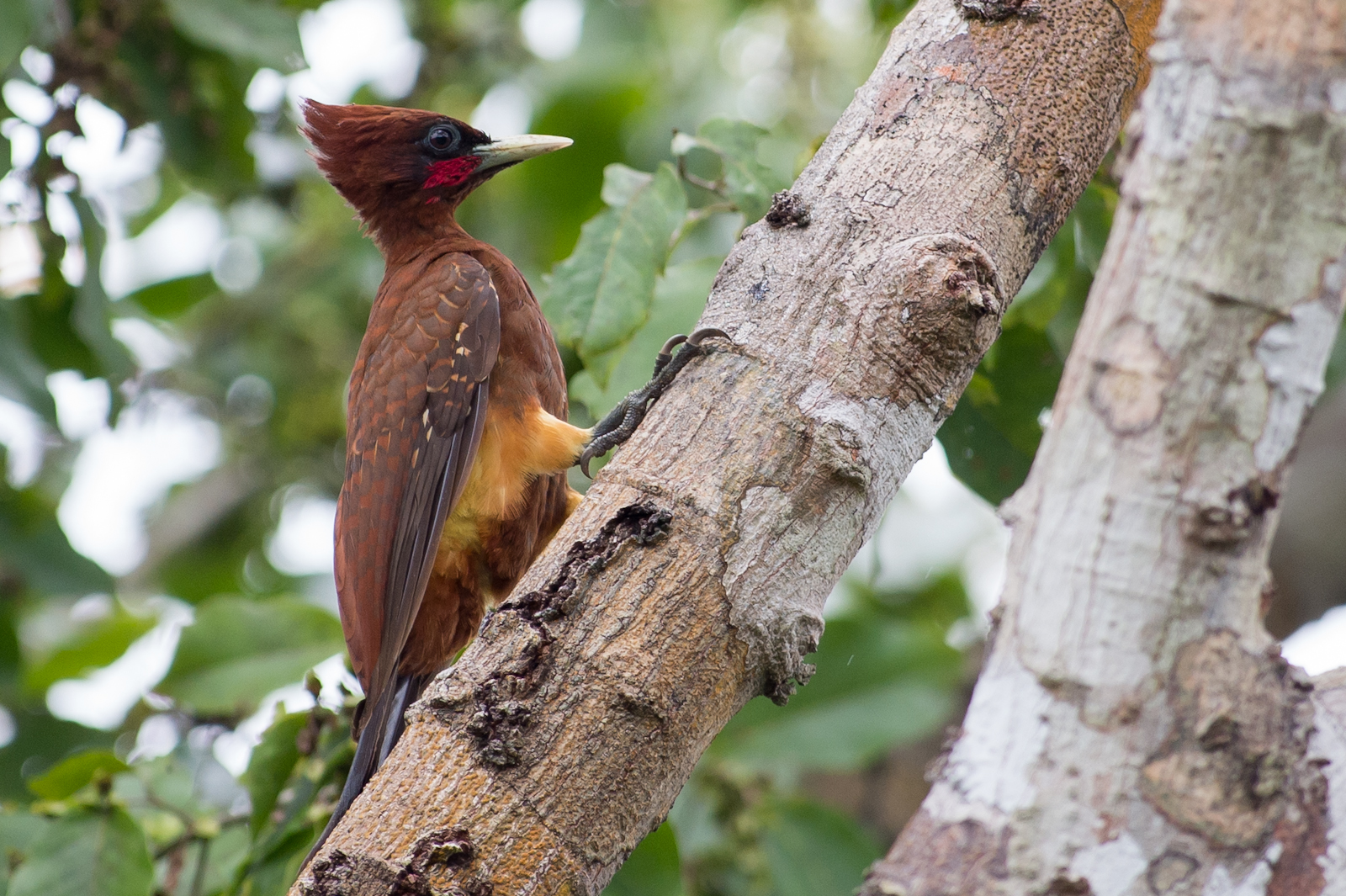

Conservation status
- Least Concern (IUCN 3.1)

Scientific classification
- Kingdom: Animalia
- Phylum: Chordata
- Class: Aves
- Order: Piciformes
- Family: Picidae
- Genus: Celeus
- Species: C. elegans

Binomial name
- Celeus elegans (Müller, 1776)

Subspecies
- see text

= Chestnut woodpecker =

Species of bird

The chestnut woodpecker (Celeus elegans) a species of bird in subfamily Picinae of the woodpecker family Picidae. It is found on Trinidad and in every mainland South American country except Argentina, Chile, Paraguay, and Uruguay.

== Taxonomy and systematics ==
The chestnut woodpecker has these six subspecies:

- C. e. hellmayri Berlepsch, 1908
- C. e. deltanus Phelps, W.H. & Phelps, W.H. Jr., 1950
- C. e. leotaudi Hellmayr, 1906
- C. e. elegans (Müller, P.L.S. 1776)
- C. e. citreopygius Sclater, P.L. & Salvin, 1867
- C. e. jumanus (Spix, 1824)

Some studies have found that subspecies citreopygius and jumanus are more closely related to the blond-crested woodpecker (C. flavescens) than to the other chestnut woodpecker subspecies. They have at times been treated as one or two separate species, and their exact placement is not fully resolved. Several more subspecies have been proposed as divisions of the six, but all have been determined to be either indistinguishable from one of the six, an aberrant form of one of them, or a hybrid.

== Description ==
The chestnut woodpecker is about 26 to 32 cm (10 to 13 in) long. Subspecies C. e. hellmayri weighs 138 to 168 g (4.9 to 5.9 oz), C. e. leotaudi weighs 93 to 139 g (3.3 to 4.9 oz), and C. e. jumanus weighs 112 to 146 g (4.0 to 5.1 oz). Males of all subspecies have a wide bright red malar area and cheek; females have no red. In the nominate subspecies C. e. elegans adults of both sexes have a buffish cream forehead, crown, and crest. The rest of their head including the chin and throat are deep chestnut brown. They have deep rufous-chestnut upperparts with a cream-buff rump and uppertail coverts, and sometimes faint black bars on the back. Their flight feathers are blackish brown with rufous bars at their base. Their wing coverts have small white spots. Their tail feathers are blackish with some rufous on the outermost pair. Their underparts are dark chestnut brown; sometimes the belly and vent are lighter. Their flanks are a paler creamy cinnamon-buff and often have obscure darker bars. The adult's bill is ivory to yellow or greenish yellow, their iris red-brown to red, and their legs olive to dark gray. Juveniles are similar to adults but havea dull blackish face and darker mottling on their underparts.

Subspecies C. e. hellmayri is somewhat darker than the nominate overall and especially on the crown; its wing coverts have more spots and the flight feathers more bars. C. e. deltanus is even darker on its crown than hellmayri. Subspecies C. e. leotaudi is paler and brighter than the nominate and has a tawny crown and a yellower rump. C. e. jumanus is darker overall than the nominate and the three above subspecies. Its crest is shorter, its back feathers have rufous tips, its wing coverts no spots, and its flight feathers are more rufous. C. e. citreopygius, like jumanus, has a short crest, but is blacker overall with less rufous.

== Distribution and habitat ==
The subspecies of the chestnut woodpecker are found thus:

- C. e. hellmayri, eastern Venezuela, Guyana, western Suriname, and northern Roraima in Brazil
- C. e. deltanus, northeastern Venezuela's Delta Amacuro state
- C. e. leotaudi, Trinidad
- C. e. elegans, eastern Suriname, French Guiana, and northern Brazil north of the Amazon between the Rio Branco and the state of Amapá
- C. e. citreopygius, eastern Ecuador and eastern Peru
- C. e. jumanus, from eastern Colombia and southern Venezuela south through western and central Brazil into northern Bolivia

The chestnut woodpecker inhabits the interior and edges of both dense and lighter forests. These include terra firme, gallery, and várzea forests. It also occurs in secondary forest and cocoa and other plantations. In elevation it ranges from sea level to 1,000 m (3,300 ft) in Venezuela, to 500 m (1,600 ft) in Colombia, to 1,100 m (3,600 ft) in Peru, and to 700 m (2,300 ft) in Ecuador (though usually below 500 m (1,600 ft) there).

== Behavior ==
=== Movement ===
The chestnut woodpecker is a year-round resident throughout its range.

=== Feeding ===
The chestnut woodpecker's primary food is ants and termites; fly larvae and fruit are also significant parts of its diet. It forages singly, in pairs, or in small loose groups, and frequently joins mixed species feeding flocks. It mostly forages from the understorey to the sub-canopy, and usually on trunks and large limbs. It captures prey by gleaning from trees and by breaking open arboreal termitaria.

=== Breeding ===
The chestnut woodpecker breeds in April and May on Trinidad and in French Guiana; its breeding season in Venezuela and northwestern Brazil includes at least January and February. It excavates a nest cavity in a dead tree or stub. The clutch size is three eggs. The incubation period, time to fledging, and details of parental care are not known.

=== Vocal and non-vocal sounds ===
The chestnut woodpecker's territorial call is a "[d]escending 'wewa ew-ew-ew-ew-ew-ew' or sarcastic-sounding 'har-hahaha'". It also makes "rattling screeches, e.g. 'whick-frrr' or grating 'wháa-jer'", a "wick-wick-wick-wick-wick", a "mellow 'gwarrr'", and a "nasal 'kyeenh'". Its drum is a double rap "dop-dop", given by both sexes "frequently and loudly in breeding season".

== Status ==
The IUCN has assessed the chestnut woodpecker to be a least-concern species. It has a very large range but its population size is not known and is believed to be decreasing. No immediate threats have been identified. It ranges from uncommon to very common in different parts of its range and occurs in several protected areas.
