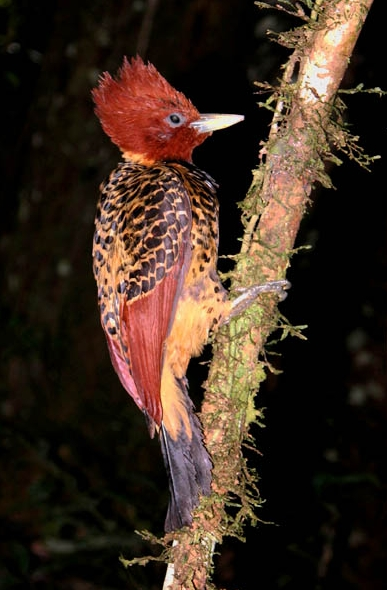

Conservation status
- Least Concern (IUCN 3.1)

Scientific classification
- Kingdom: Animalia
- Phylum: Chordata
- Class: Aves
- Order: Piciformes
- Family: Picidae
- Genus: Celeus
- Species: C. spectabilis

Binomial name
- Celeus spectabilis Sclater, PL & Salvin, 1880

= Rufous-headed woodpecker =

Species of bird

The rufous-headed woodpecker (Celeus spectabilis) is a species of bird in subfamily Picinae of the woodpecker family Picidae. It is found in Bolivia, Brazil, Ecuador, and Peru.

== Taxonomy and systematics ==
The rufous-headed woodpecker has two subspecies, the nominate C. s. spectabilis (Sclater, PL & Salvin, 1880) and C. s. exsul (Bond & Meyer de Schauensee, 1941). What is now Kaempfer's woodpecker (C. obrieni) was included as a third subspecies until the early 2000s.

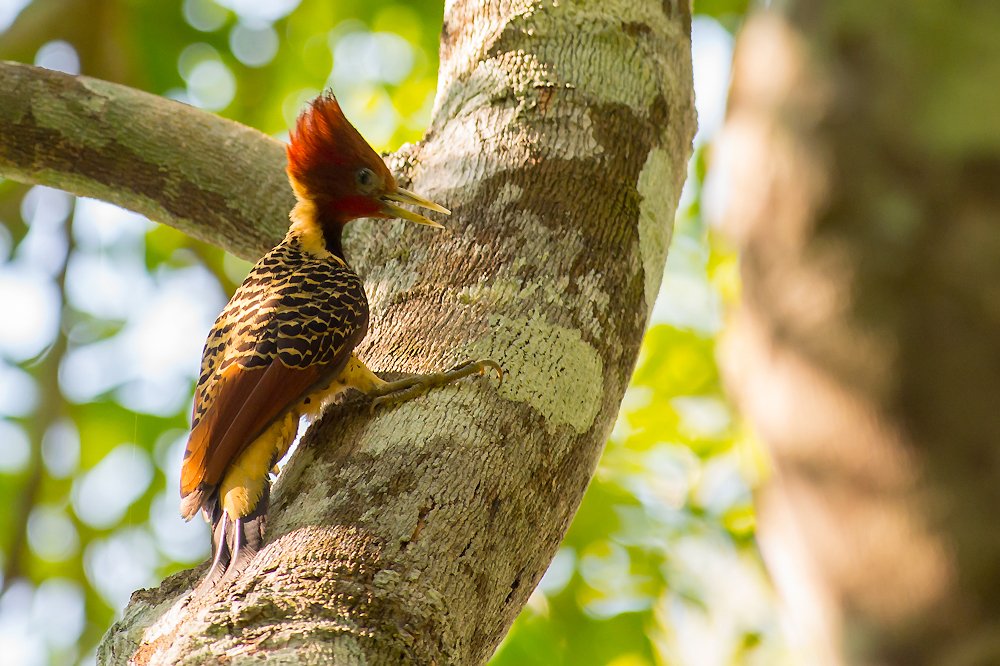
Male in Acre, Brazil

== Description ==
The rufous-headed woodpecker is about 26 to 28 cm (10 to 11 in) long. Subspecies C. s. exsul weighs about 111 g (3.9 oz); weight data are lacking for the nominate. The sexes differ only on their heads: Adult males of both subspecies have a deep red malar patch and a larger one on their bushy crest; females do not have the red malar and have at most a trace of red on the crest. Both sexes of both subspecies have a rufous-chestnut head. They have a cream-buff patch low on the neck that extends down the side of the breast and a black lower throat and breast. Their hindneck and upper back are creamy buff to pale cinnamon-yellow with very wide black bars. Their lower back, rump, and uppertail coverts are yellow-buff to cinnamon-buff, sometimes with a few black streaks. Their wing coverts are black with cream-buff edges and narrow bars. Their primaries are brownish black with rufous bases, and their secondaries and tertials rufous-chestnut with black tips. Their tail is black, sometimes with pale barring on the outermost pair of feathers. On the nominate, the sides of the breast and the rest of their underparts are cream-buff to pale cinnamon-buff with heavy black bars on the former and black chevrons on the latter. Subspecies C. s. exsul has variable black marking on its underparts, though usually there is less barring on the breast than the nominate, and the belly has chevrons or heart-shaped marks. Both subspecies' bills are pale yellowish or grayish ivory, their iris deep red-brown, and their legs olive green to grayish. Juveniles resemble adults but have a darker bill, more blackish on the front of the head, and more red on the crown.

== Distribution and habitat ==
The nominate subspecies of rufous-headed woodpecker is found in eastern Ecuador and northeastern Peru. Subspecies C. s. exsul is found in southeastern Peru, in Brazil's Acre state, and in northern Bolivia's Beni and Cochabamba departments. The species inhabits humid tropical rainforest, usually along rivers and on their islands. In Peru and Brazil it is often associated with Chusquea and Guadua bamboo, while in Ecuador if favors landscapes with Cecropia trees, and an understorey of Gynerium cane with much Heliconia. In elevation it ranges only as high as about 300 m (1,000 ft).

== Behavior ==
=== Movement ===
The rufous-headed woodpecker is a year-round resident throughout its range.

=== Feeding ===
The rufous-headed woodpecker is believed to feed mainly on bamboo ants, though its diet probably includes other insects as well. It typically forages singly or in pairs, and at any level of the forest and also on fallen logs. It probes and very forcefully pecks at trunks, branches, and bamboo to reveal its prey.

=== Breeding ===
The rufous-headed woodpecker's breeding season in Peru includes at least from June to August but is unknown elsewhere. Only two nests have been described; one was about 3 m (10 ft) up in a dead snag and the other about 2 m (7 ft) up in a live Cavanillesia tree. The first was predated before the unrecorded number of eggs hatched. The second held one chick that was being provisioned by a male. Nothing else is known about the species' breeding biology.

=== Vocal and non-vocal sounds ===
The rufous-headed woodpecker's song is "a loud squealing 'skweeah' followed by bubbling 'kluh-kluh-kluh-kluh-kluh' series". It also gives "a mewing chuckle, 'wur-hee-hrr-hrr-hrr'", and when agitated "harsh squawks". It drums "rolls being evenly pitched" and loud when the substrate is hollow bamboo.

== Status ==
The IUCN has assessed the rufous-headed woodpecker as being of Least Concern. It has a fairly large range but its population size and trend are not known. No immediate threats have been identified. It is considered generally rare though not uncommon in its small Brazilian range. "In view of its apparently strict habitat requirements and its low density and general scarcity, however, it may perhaps merit the conservation status of Near Threatened."
