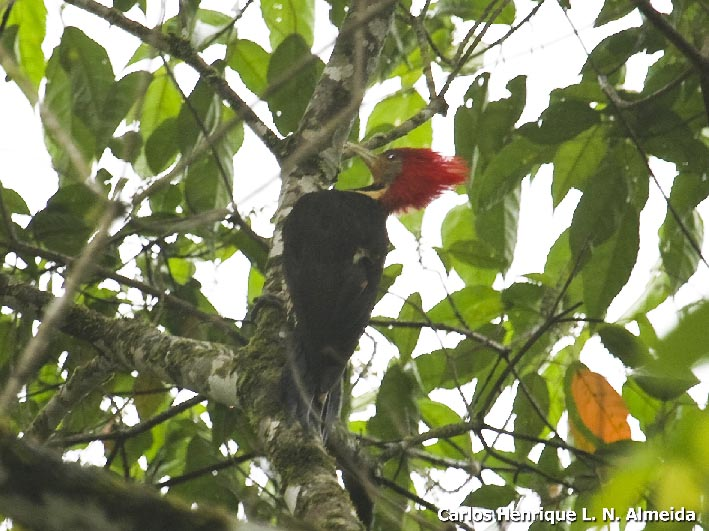
- at Intervales State Park, Ribeirão Grande, São Paulo State, Brazil

Conservation status
- Vulnerable (IUCN 3.1)

Scientific classification
- Kingdom: Animalia
- Phylum: Chordata
- Class: Aves
- Order: Piciformes
- Family: Picidae
- Genus: Celeus
- Species: C. galeatus

Binomial name
- Celeus galeatus (Temminck, 1822)

Synonyms
- Hylatomus galeatus Dryocopus galeatus

= Helmeted woodpecker =

Species of bird

The helmeted woodpecker (Celeus galeatus) is a Vulnerable species of bird in subfamily Picinae of the woodpecker family Picidae. It is found in Argentina, Brazil, and Paraguay.

== Taxonomy and systematics ==
Coenraad Jacob Temminck described the helmeted woodpecker in 1822. It was reclassified in genus Hylatomus and several others at various times. Upon sequencing the mitochondrial and nuclear DNA, two studies published in 2015 found that it belonged in its current genus Celeus. Its specific epithet is from the Latin word galea, meaning "helmet". The placement of the helmeted woodpecker in genus Celeus is generally accepted.

The helmeted woodpecker is monotypic.

== Description ==
The helmeted woodpecker is about 25 cm (9.8 in) long with a 31.5 to 35 mm (1.2 to 1.4 in) bill, and weighs about 124 to 150 g (4.4 to 5.3 oz). Both sexes have a cinnamon face with a long red crest. The sexes differ only on their heads: Adult males have a red malar patch that extends down to the sides of the throat and around the back of the head to meet the crest. Females have the red crest but no other red on their head. Both sexes have a black throat and hindneck with a vertical white stripe between them on the side of the neck. Their upper back is black or brownish black becoming buff or creamy on their lower back. Their uppertail coverts are cream-buff and extend over half the length of the tail. Their wings are brownish black with cinnamon bases on some flight feathers. Their tail is black. Their lower throat and upper breast are black spotted with cinnamon and the rest of their underparts are buffy white with black bars that are widest on the breast. Their bill is ivory with a gray or blue-gray base, their iris brown, and their legs dark gray. Juveniles resemble adults but are browner with less red on their crown, gray ear coverts, and more extensive barring.

The helmeted woodpecker resembles two larger woodpeckers, the lineated woodpecker (Dryocopus lineatus) and the robust woodpecker (Campephilus robustus). This apparent mimicry might reduce aggression toward the smaller helmeted woodpecker. Their genetic distance means that the resemblances "probably result from convergence rather than phylogenetic affinity."

== Distribution and habitat ==
The helmeted woodpecker is found in the southern Brazilian states of São Paulo, Paraná, and Santa Catarina, and possibly formerly in Rio Grande do Sul. Its range also includes the eastern half of Paraguay and Misiones Province in far northeastern Argentina. The helmeted woodpecker is mostly found in large tracts of Atlantic Forest, both semi-deciduous and mixed deciduous-coniferous. It also occurs, but only rarely, in disturbed forest, plantations of introduced tree species, and small forest fragments. In elevation it ranges from sea level to about 1,000 m (3,300 ft).

== Behavior ==
=== Movement ===
The helmeted woodpecker is a year-round resident throughout its range.

=== Feeding ===
The helmeted woodpecker mostly forages in the forest's mid-storey though it uses all levels. Much of its foraging is by gentle probing with less hammering and bark flaking, and often "works" soft decaying trees. Few details are known of its diet but it has several times been observed eating insect larvae and less frequently ants and berries. It is usually seen singly or in pairs, but has been observed in mixed species feeding flocks.

=== Breeding ===
The helmeted woodpecker's egg laying season apparently begins in late September but the nesting season's duration is not known. The few known nests were excavated in dead branches or trunks. Their height above the ground ranged from 2.3 to 5 m (8 to 16 ft). The clutch size, incubation period, time to fledging, and details of parental care are not known.

=== Vocal and non-vocal sounds ===
The helmeted woodpecker does not vocalize often. Its "long call" is "a strident, fairly drawn out kwee-kwee-kwee-kwee with four to ten notes" that can be heard for more than 500 m (1,600 ft). It also gives "a mournful, descending tu-du-du-du-du-du-du call". Its drumming is "fairly soft, uniform in pattern, and rather short".

== Status ==
The IUCN originally assessed the helmeted woodpecker in 1988 as Threatened, then in 1994 as Endangered, and since 2000 as Vulnerable. It has a limited range and its estimated population of 3600 mature individuals is believed to be decreasing. Much of its Atlantic Forest habitat has been cleared and fragmented for timber, agriculture, ranching, and for pine plantations. Its dependence on large dead trees for nesting and feeding contribute to its vulnerability.
