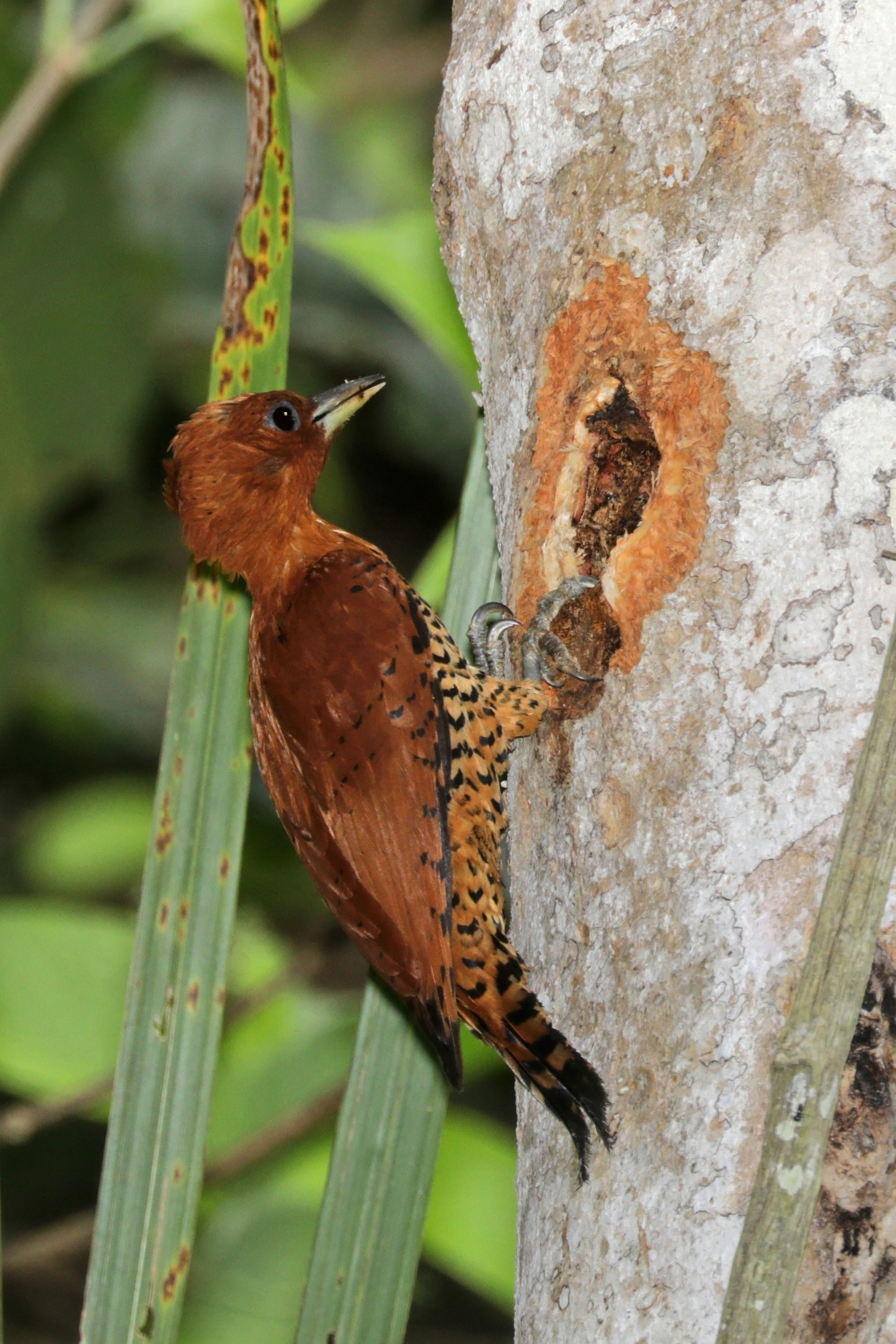

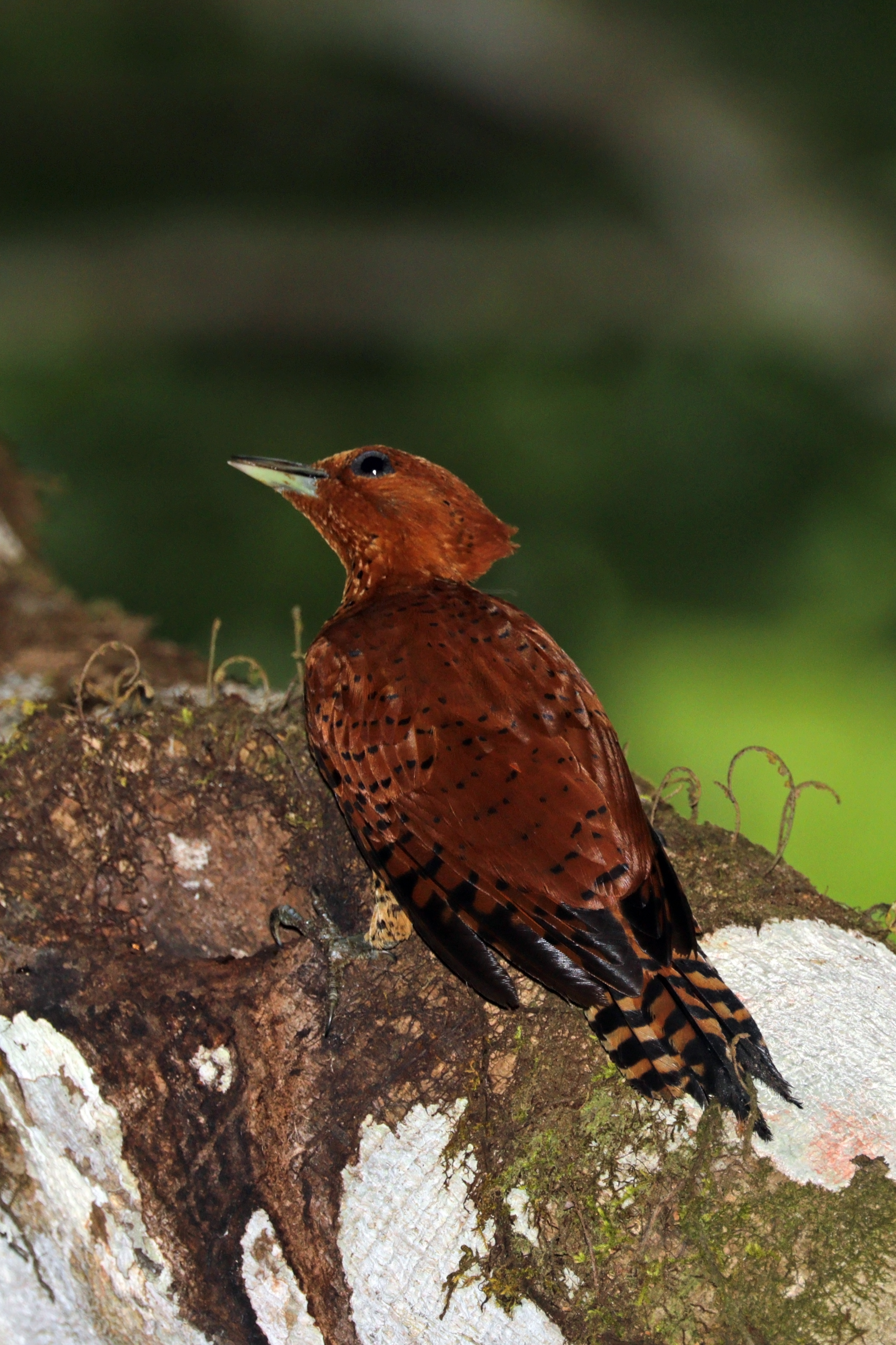
- Both females in Panama

Conservation status
- Least Concern (IUCN 3.1)

Scientific classification
- Kingdom: Animalia
- Phylum: Chordata
- Class: Aves
- Order: Piciformes
- Family: Picidae
- Genus: Celeus
- Species: C. loricatus

Binomial name
- Celeus loricatus (Reichenbach, 1854)

= Cinnamon woodpecker =

Species of bird

The cinnamon woodpecker (Celeus loricatus) is a species of bird in subfamily Picinae of the woodpecker family Picidae. It is found in Colombia, Costa Rica, Ecuador, Nicaragua, and Panama.

== Taxonomy and systematics ==
The cinnamon woodpecker has these four subspecies:

- C. l. diversus Ridgway, 1914
- C. l. mentalis Cassin, 1860
- C. l. innotatus Todd, 1917
- C. l. loricatus (Reichenbach, 1854)

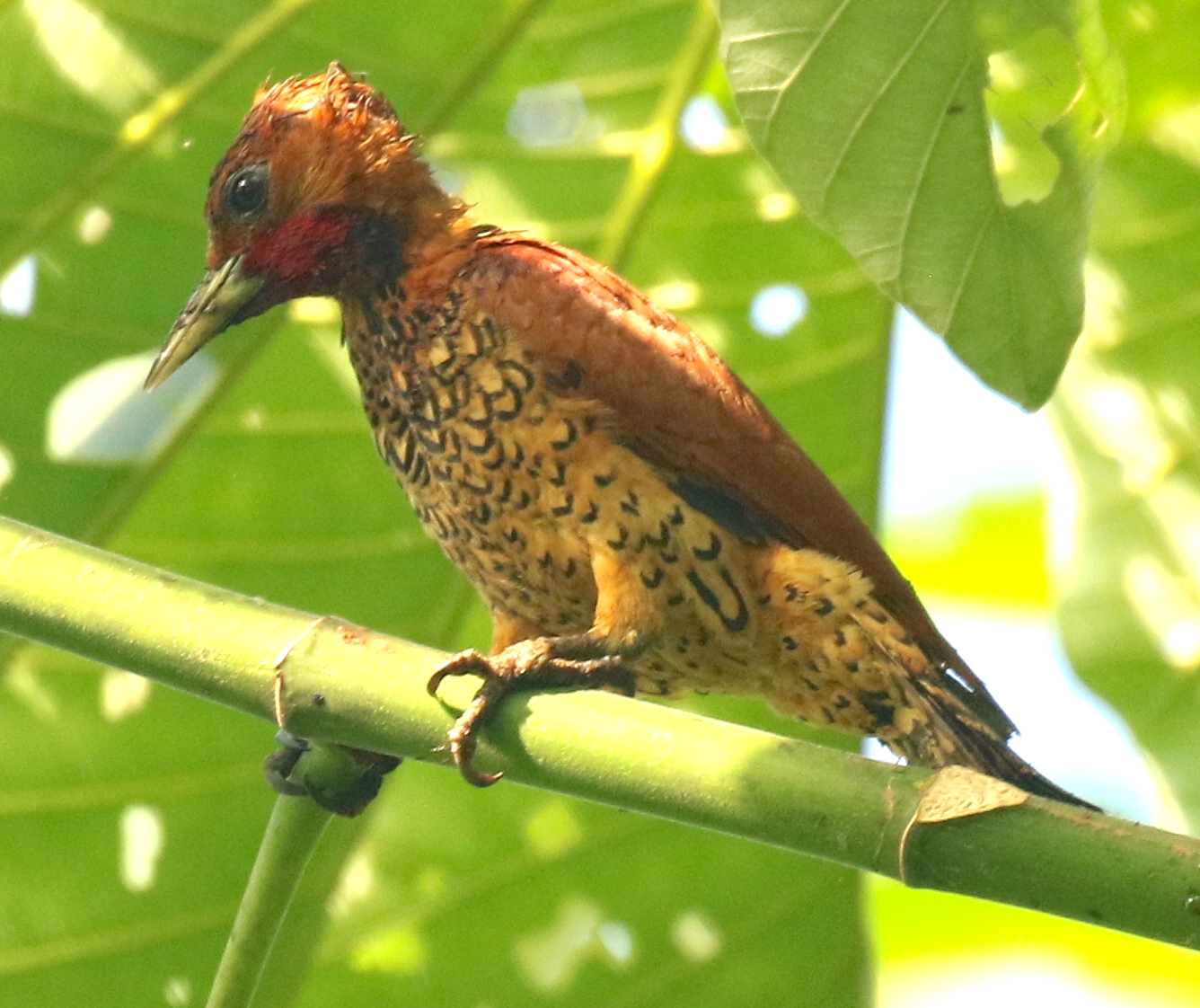
Aligandi area, Darien, Panama

== Description ==
The cinnamon woodpecker is about 19 to 23 cm (7.5 to 9.1 in) long and weighs 74 to 83 g (2.6 to 2.9 oz). Males and females have the same plumage except on their faces. Both sexes' heads are rufous with a bushy crest and black streaks on the crown. Males have a red chin, throat, and malar with black streaks, and females are the same rufous there as on the rest of their head. Both sexes of adults of the nominate subspecies C. l. loricatus have dark rufous upperparts with narrow black bars. Their flight feathers are blackish with wide rufous bars. The top side of their tail is black with wide buff to whitish bars. Their upper breast is light rufous with black edges and tips to the feathers; the rest of their underparts are paler buff with bold black arrowhead-shaped marks. Their medium-long bill is grayish to yellowish, their iris red, and their legs gray. Juveniles are very similar to adults but with dusky mottling on the throat and irregular markings on their underparts.

Subspecies C. l. diversus is the largest. It has more red and less black on the throat and is a stronger cinnamon color than the nominate. It has narrow black bars above, more widely spaced markings below, and a yellower bill. C. l. mentalis is similar to diversus but paler and with less barring above and below. C. l. innotatus is even paler than mentalis with weak or no barring on the upperparts and plain or lightly spotted underparts.

== Distribution and habitat ==
The subspecies of cinnamon woodpecker are found thus:

- C. l. diversus, from southeastern Nicaragua through Costa Rica into western Panama
- C. l. mentalis, Panama and extreme northwestern Colombia
- C. l. innotatus, northern Colombia between the departments of Córdoba and Santander
- C. l. loricatus, from western Colombia's Chocó Department south to Ecuador's Guayas Province

The cinnamon woodpecker mostly inhabits the interior of humid to wet forest, and occurs only rarely in drier areas. It occasionally is found along the forest edge and in more open landscapes like treed pastures, secondary forest, and clearings. In elevation it ranges from sea level to 760 m (2,500 ft) in Costa Rica and Panama, to 1,500 m (4,900 ft) in Colombia, and to 800 m (2,600 ft) in Ecuador.

== Behavior ==
=== Movement ===
The cinnamon woodpecker is a year-round resident throughout its range.

=== Feeding ===
The cinnamon woodpecker's primary food is ants and termites; it also eats fruit such as bananas. It usually forages singly or in pairs but does occasionally join mixed-species feeding flocks. In the forest interior it mostly forages near or in the canopy but hunts lower in more open areas. It usually pecks to get its prey but also gleans.

=== Breeding ===
The cinnamon woodpecker's breeding season is March to May in Costa Rica and January to April in Colombia; it has not been defined elsewhere. Both sexes excavate the nest cavity, in a living or recently dead tree, and typically between 6 and 9 m (20 and 30 ft) above the ground. The clutch size, incubation period, time to fledging, and details of parental care are not known.

=== Vocal and non-vocal sounds ===
The cinnamon woodpecker's distinctive call is "a loud and far-carrying 'wheeét!-wheeét-wheet-it', sometimes with an introductory 'chuweeo'." Other vocalizations are a "sharp, descending rolling chatter when agitated", a "chikikikiít", "tititit-toò", and "chweé-titit". Its drumming is slow and short.

== Status ==
The IUCN has assessed the cinnamon woodpecker as being of Least Concern. It has a large range and an estimated population of at least 50,000 mature individuals, though the latter is believed to be decreasing. No immediate threats have been identified. It is considered "[g]enerally uncommon, but locally fairly common" and is more often heard than seen. It occurs in several protected areas.
