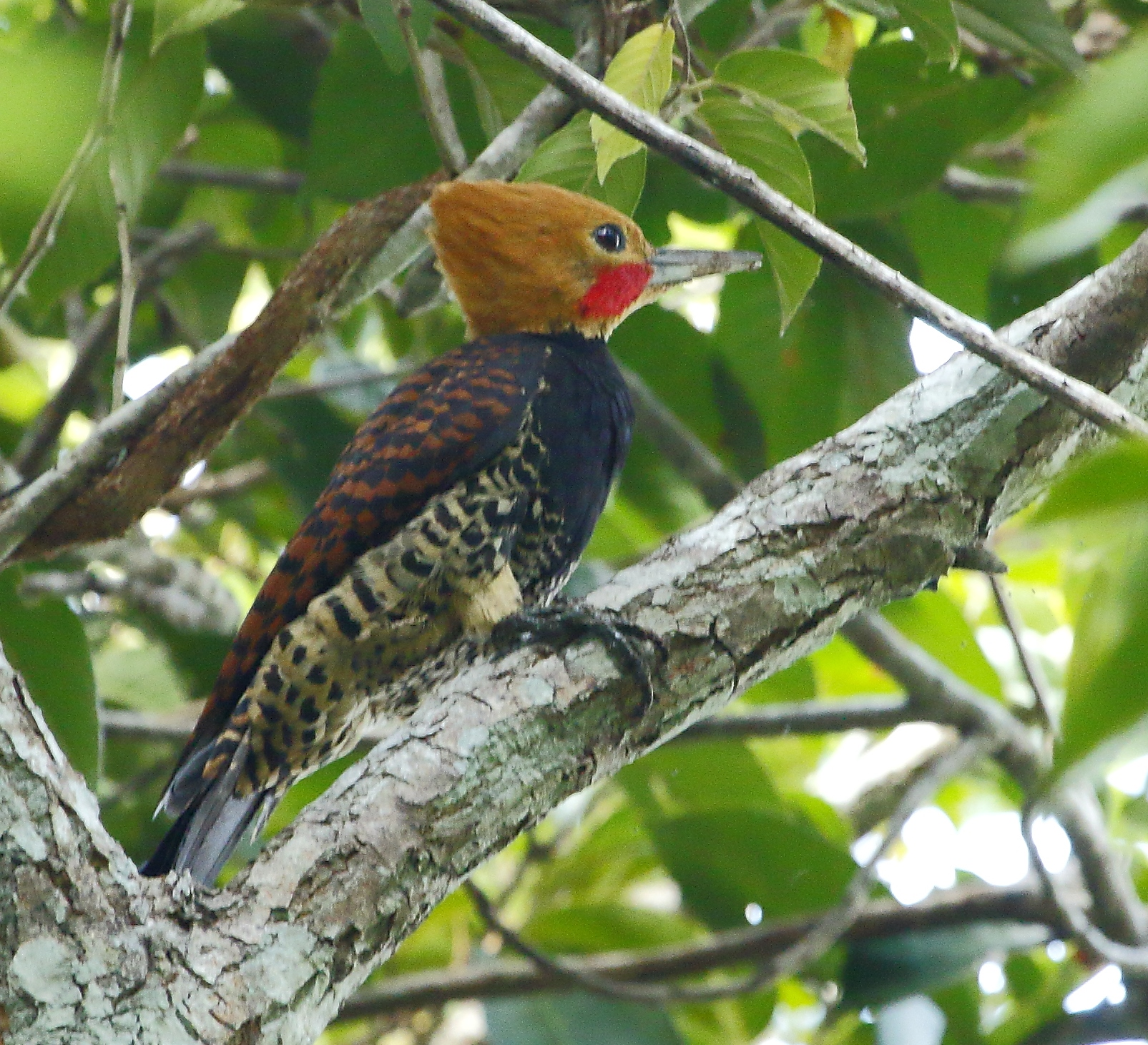
- A male ringed woodpecker at Vale Natural Reserve, Linhares, Espírito Santo state, Brazil

Conservation status
- Near Threatened (IUCN 3.1)(But see Taxonomy and Status sections)

Scientific classification
- Kingdom: Animalia
- Phylum: Chordata
- Class: Aves
- Order: Piciformes
- Family: Picidae
- Genus: Celeus
- Species: C. torquatus

Binomial name
- Celeus torquatus (Boddaert, 1783)
- Range of C. t. torquatus

Synonyms
- Picus torquatus Boddaert, 1783

= Ringed woodpecker =

Species of bird

The ringed woodpecker (Celeus torquatus) is a species of bird in subfamily Picinae of the woodpecker family Picidae. It is found in every mainland South American country except Argentina, Chile, Paraguay, and Uruguay.

== Taxonomy and systematics ==
The ringed woodpecker was described by the French polymath Georges-Louis Leclerc, Comte de Buffon in 1780 in his Histoire Naturelle des Oiseaux from a specimen collected in Cayenne, French Guiana. The bird was also illustrated in a hand-colored plate engraved by François-Nicolas Martinet in the Planches Enluminées D'Histoire Naturelle, which was produced under the supervision of Edme-Louis Daubenton to accompany Buffon's text. Neither the plate caption nor Buffon's description included a scientific name, but in 1783 the Dutch naturalist Pieter Boddaert coined the binomial name Picus torquatus in his catalogue of the Planches Enluminées. Early in the 20th century the ringed woodpecker was placed in its own genus Cerchneipicus. By the middle of the century Cerchneipicus had been merged into its current genus Celeus that was introduced by the German zoologist Friedrich Boie in 1831. The generic name is from the Ancient Greek word keleos for a "green woodpecker". The specific epithet torquatus is the Latin for "collared".

The South American Classification Committee of the American Ornithological Society, the International Ornithological Committee, and the Clements taxonomy assign these three subspecies to the ringed woodpecker:

- C. t. torquatus (Boddaert, 1783)
- C. t. occidentalis (Hargitt, 1889)
- C. t. tinnunculus (Wagler, 1829)

BirdLife International's Handbook of the Birds of the World (HBW) treats each as a full species, adding the Amazonian black-breasted woodpecker (Celeus occidentalis) and the Atlantic black-breasted woodpecker (Celeus tinnunculus) to the ringed woodpecker sensu stricto. The split was based on plumage differences; no genetic study has been made.

This article follows the three-subspecies model.

== Description ==
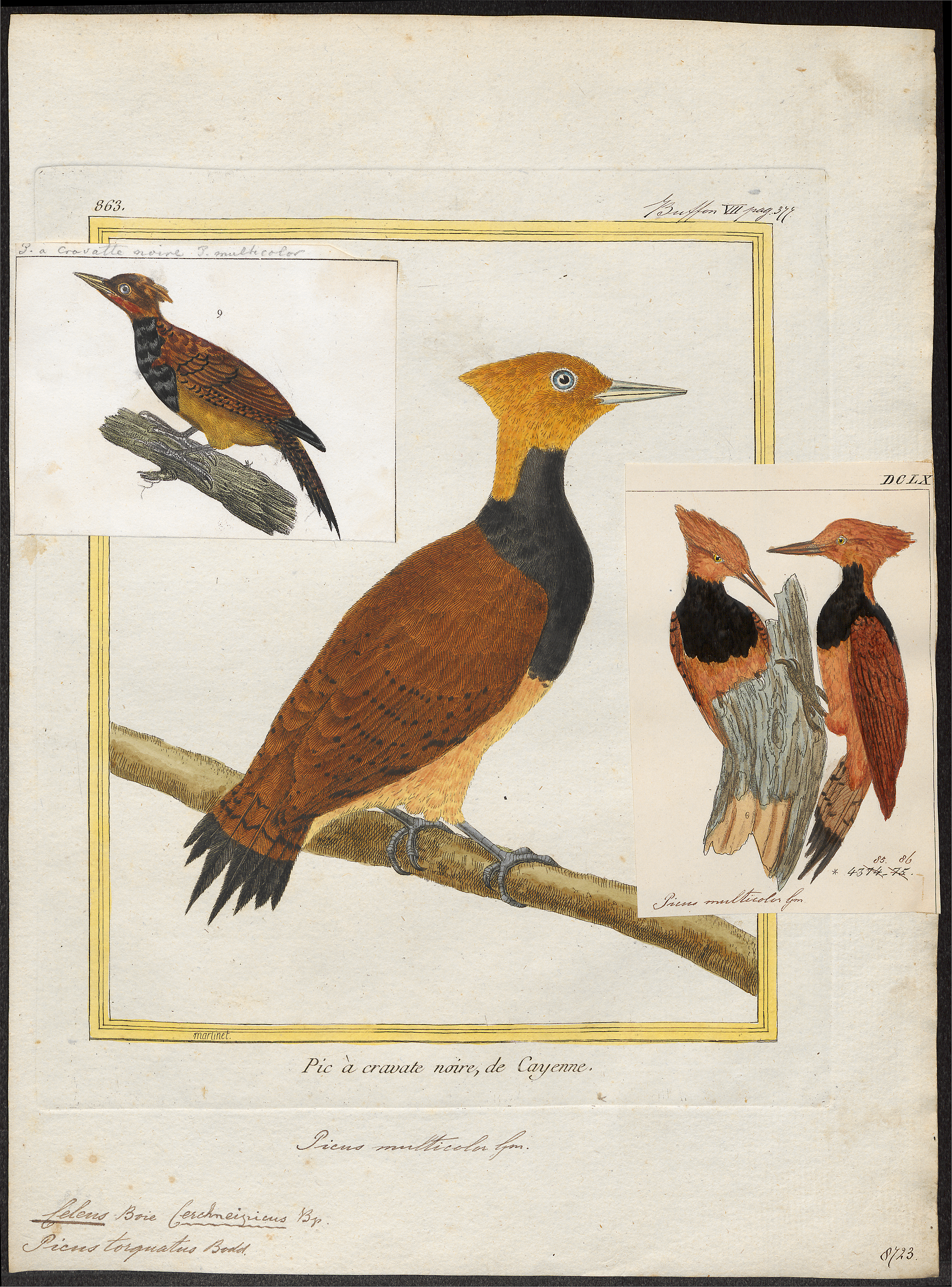
the nominate subspecies C. t. torquatus

The ringed woodpecker is 26 to 29 cm (10 to 11 in) long. The nominate subspecies C. t. torquatus weighs 107 to 124 g (3.8 to 4.4 oz) and C. t. occidentalis weighs 122 to 135 g (4.3 to 4.8 oz); weight data are lacking for C. t. tinnunculus. Both sexes of all subspecies have a pale cinnamon head with a rufous tinge and a moderately bushy crest. The sexes differ only on their faces: Adult males of all subspecies have a red patch from the malar area to under the ear coverts, and sometimes have some red elsewhere on the head; females have no red on the head. Adults of the nominate subspecies have a black lower throat, breast, and upper mantle. Their upperparts from the lower mantle to the uppertail coverts are rufous brown. There are usually a few black feathers on the lower mantle and black marks and bars on the wing coverts. Their flight feathers are barred black and rufous, with blackish brown tips on the primaries and more rufous on the secondaries. Their tail is rufous with narrow black bars and a wide black tip. They have unmarked cinnamon-buff underparts. All subspecies' bills are long with a maxilla that is various shades of gray or brown and a grayish white or greenish yellow mandible. Their iris is red to red-brown and their legs gray brown or dark gray. Juveniles resemble adults but have more black on their face and more barring on their upperparts.

Subspecies C. t. occidentalis has a somewhat darker head than the nominate. It has a black breast and black bars on the mantle rather than solid black. Its back, flight feathers, and tail also have black bars. Its underparts are tawny rufous with black bars rather than the nominate's plain cinnamon-buff. Subspecies C. t. tinnunculus has its entire upperparts buffy rufous with black bars and its flight feathers barred rufous and black. Its tail's central feathers are rufous with black bars and tips; the outer three pairs are mostly black. Their lower throat and the middle of their breast is black. The rest of their underparts are pale buffish white with heavy dark barring that approaches "V" shape on the flanks.

== Distribution and habitat ==
The subspecies of the ringed woodpecker are found thus:

- C. t. torquatus, northeastern Venezuela, the Guianas, and northern Amazonian Brazil (The map shows only this subspecies' range)
- C. t. occidentalis, southeastern Colombia, southern Venezuela, northeastern Ecuador, eastern Peru, northern Bolivia, and western and central Amazonian Brazil
- C. t. tinnunculus, eastern Brazil's states of Bahia and Espírito Santo

Subspecies C. t. torquatus and C. t. occidentalis mostly inhabit tall humid tropical forest, especially terra firme. They also occur in várzea and secondary forest, gallery forest, and cerrado. In elevation they range from about 100 m (300 ft) to 725 m (2,400 ft) in Peru, to 750 m (2,500 ft) in Bolivia, to 800 m (2,600 ft) in Amazonian Brazil, and 950 m (3,100 ft) in Venezuela. Subspecies C. t. tinnunculus is found only in large tracts of closed canopy Atlantic Forest between sea level and 100 m (300 ft).

== Behavior ==
=== Movement ===
The ringed woodpecker is a year-round resident throughout its range.

=== Feeding ===
The ringed woodpecker seems to have various foraging strategies in different parts of its range. In most it typically forages from the forest understorey to below the canopy, but in the west of its range appears to prefer from the mid-level up. It usually forages singly or in pairs, but also in small groups. In the north is sometimes joins mixed species feeding flocks. Its diet is not known in detail but includes ants, seeds, and fruit. It takes prey by gleaning, chiseling small holes into wood, and hammering to open arboreal termitaria.

=== Breeding ===
Essentially nothing is known about the ringed woodpecker's breeding biology.

=== Vocal and non-vocal sounds ===
Vocalizations of the three subspecies of the ringed woodpecker do not much differ. They make a "primary call" or song, a "series of 2‒7 loud ringing whistles at stable pitch and pace: klee-klee-klee-klee." The "rising call" is a "series of 4‒9 loud strident whistles...gradually rising in pitch and often increasing in amplitude: kluuu-klu-klu-klu-klu!." The "whinny" is a "short and fast series of some 4‒6 shrill notes, the last note at a lower pitch: ki-ki-ki-kyu." Most calling is at dawn with very little vocal activity during the day. Both sexes drum, but infrequently, with "a typical duration of 1‒2s with knocks at a stable pace of ⁓15‒20/s."

== Status ==
The IUCN follows HBW taxonomy and so has assessed the three subspecies of the ringed woodpecker separately. It has assessed the ringed woodpecker sensu stricto (C. t. torquatus) as Near Threatened. It has a large range but its population size is not known and is believed to be decreasing. "The primary threat to this species is accelerating deforestation in the Amazon Basin as land is cleared for cattle ranching and soy production, facilitated by expansion of the road network." The "Amazonian black-breasted woodpecker" (C. t. occidentalis) is assessed as being of Least Concern. Like the previous taxon it has a large range and an unknown population size believed to be decreasing, but no immediate threats have been identified. The "Atlantic black-breasted woodpecker" (C. t. tinnunculus) is assessed as Vulnerable. It has a limited range and like the others an unknown population size believed to be decreasing. Less than 20% of its Atlantic Forest habitat remains and much of that is fragmented. Conversion for farming, ranching, and pulp plantations are the main culprits.
