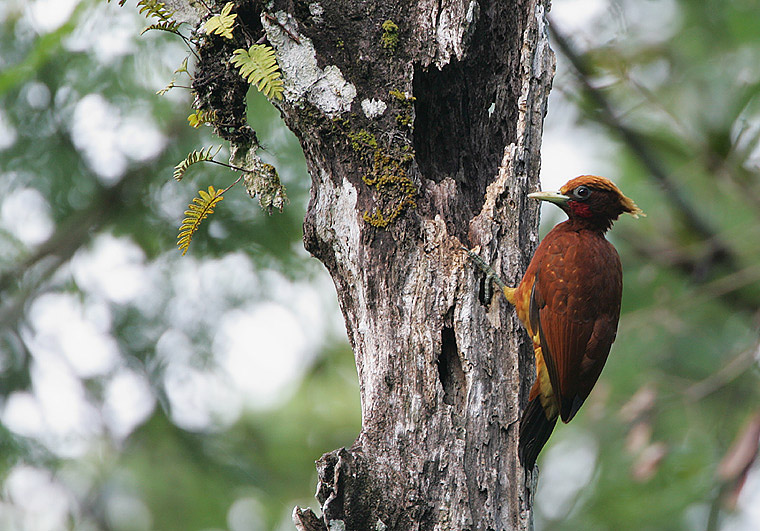
- Chestnut woodpecker (Celeus elegans)

Scientific classification
- Kingdom: Animalia
- Phylum: Chordata
- Class: Aves
- Order: Piciformes
- Family: Picidae
- Tribe: Picini
- Genus: Celeus; F. Boie, 1831

Type species
- Picus flavescens Gmelin, 1788

Species
- See text

= Celeus (bird) =

Genus of birds

Celeus is a genus of bird in the woodpecker family, Picidae, found in tropical and subtropical forests and woodlands of Central and South America. The genus contains 13 extant species. One, Kaempfer's woodpecker (C. obrieni), was believed to be extinct until a specimen was caught in 2006.

The species in the genus are medium-sized, 19–32 cm (7.5–12.6 in) in length (with chestnut woodpecker (Celeus elegans) the longest), and weigh between 63 and 172 g (2.2 and 6.1 oz). They have limited plumage colour with the head and crest mainly lighter in colour. The feet, tail, tongue and bill of the birds in the genus are adapted for the specialised resources required for its survival and reproduction (for example breeding sites and large food supplies). They are native residents and do not migrate. They are generally insectivorous but will eat seeds and fruits. The birds are monogamous with both sexes sharing nest and brooding care. Some species nest communally. Many live near humans but are seen as destructive in agricultural areas.

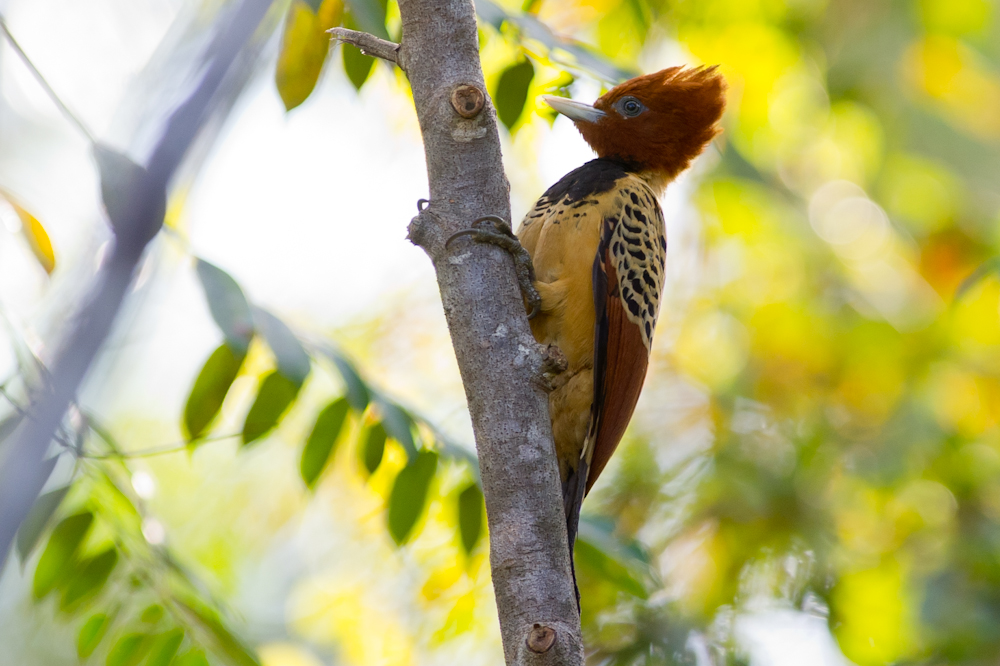
Kaempfer's woodpecker (Celeus obrieni)

== Taxonomy ==
The genus Celeus was introduced by the German zoologist Friedrich Boie in 1831. The type species was subsequently designated as the blond-crested woodpecker (Celeus flavescens) by the English zoologist George Robert Gray in 1840. The generic name is from the Ancient Greek word keleos for a "green woodpecker".

This genus is a member of the Picini tribe in the subfamily Picinae of the woodpecker family, Picidae. Most of the 13 species of Celeus are polytypic, with the species C. castaneus, C. galeatus and C. obrieni being exceptions as monotypic. Head markings were the main diagnostic feature for taxonomy until recent molecular phylogenetic analysis brought changes to the species list. Benz and Robbins (2011) in their DNA analysis of this genus found the species C. loricatus - C. torquatus as basal taxa. Recent DNA analysis placed the rufous woodpecker, previously thought to belong to Celeus, in Micropternus brachyurus. Subspecies caatinga woodpecker (C. spectabilis obrieni) previously thought extinct was captured, using a mist net by A.D Prado in Tocantins in 2006, and was elevated in 2008 to Kaempfers woodpecker (C. obrieni). The scaly-breasted woodpecker's English name has recently changed to scale-breasted woodpecker. The South Asian rufous woodpecker (Micropternus brachyurus) is a peculiar species that was formerly placed in Celeus too. However, its similarity seems to be due to convergent evolution, as it does not even seem to belong to the same tribe of Picinae as Celeus does.

Postcranial homogeneity in woodpeckers has made genus identification of fossils difficult and no Celeus fossils are noted. An example of a woodpecker fossil, Bathoceleus hyphalus, was found in 1959 in the Bahamas in a limestone Pleistocene sinkhole, and is believed to be the earliest recorded North American Picidae dated at 2.588 – 0.012 mya. The origin of the genus Celeus is ambiguous; it is not believed to have originated in Central America and may have come originally from Eurasia.

Late Pliocene continental interchange of C. loricatus and C. torquatus occurred with the opening of the Isthmus of Panama 3.1 - 4.0 mya as part of the Great American Interchange, with later radiations of these birds back across the Isthmus. Quaternary environmental changes are thought to be responsible for the relatively recent gene flow of this genus and for the shallow genetic structures of the remaining Celeus sister taxa with some of the species capable of dispersal to form allopatric, or isolated, communities. Corridors may have opened up in the last glacial period (21 ka years before the present) that may have enabled westward movement of species in this genus.

The genus contains the following 12 species:

Image	Common name	Scientific name	Distribution
	Cinnamon woodpecker	Celeus loricatus	Colombia, Costa Rica, Ecuador, Nicaragua, and Panama
	Waved woodpecker	Celeus undatus	Suriname; Brazil including Marajo Island, Ilha de Marajo, Bolivia, Colombia, Ecuador, French Guiana, Peru, and Venezuela .
	Chestnut-colored woodpecker	Celeus castaneus	Belize, Costa Rica, Guatemala, Honduras, Mexico, Nicaragua, and Panama.
	Chestnut woodpecker	Celeus elegans	Colombia, Venezuela and the Guianas south to Ecuador, Bolivia and northern and western Brazil, and on Trinidad.
	Pale-crested woodpecker	Celeus lugubris	central Bolivia and the Pantanal region of southwestern Brazil; also in central Paraguay and the border region of northern Argentina.
	Blond-crested woodpecker	Celeus flavescens	Brazil, southeastern Paraguay, and extreme northeastern Argentina.
	Ochre-backed woodpecker	Celeus ochraceus	eastern Brazil.
	Cream-colored woodpecker	Celeus flavus	Colombia, Venezuela and the Guianas to Peru, Bolivia, and the eastern part of Brazil
	Rufous-headed woodpecker	Celeus spectabilis	western Amazon basin in northern Bolivia, far southwestern Brazil (Acre), eastern Ecuador, and eastern Peru.
	Kaempfer's woodpecker	Celeus obrieni	Brazil.
	Ringed woodpecker	Celeus torquatus	northern Brazil, French Guiana, Guyana, Suriname, and western Venezuela.
	Helmeted woodpecker	Celeus galeatus	northeastern Argentina, southeastern Brazil, and eastern Paraguay.

The online edition of the Handbook of the Birds of the World has split the ringed woodpecker, creating two more species: the Amazonian black-breasted woodpecker (Celeus occidentalis) and the Atlantic black-breasted woodpecker (Celeus tinnunculus). Neither of the splits was supported by the results of molecular genetic studies. These splits have not been adopted by the online edition of the Clements Checklist of Birds of the World maintained by ornithologists at Cornell University, nor in the lists maintained by the American Ornithological Society.

== Description ==
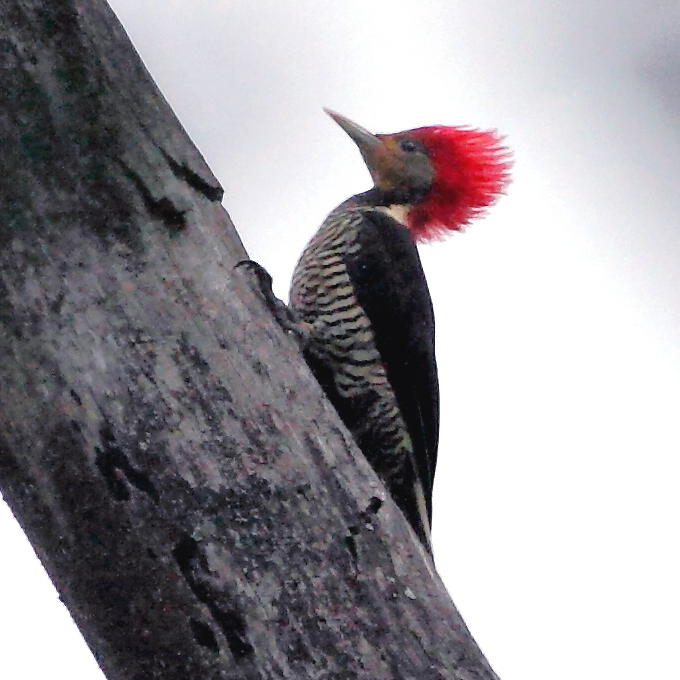
Female helmeted woodpecker formerly (Dryocopus galeatus) - now (Celeus galeatus)

The birds of the genus Celeus generally weigh between 63–172 g (2.2–6.1 oz); the heaviest of this genus is the scaly-breasted woodpecker (C. grammicus). Length, from tip of bill to tip of the tail, is between 19–32 cm (7.5–12.6 in). They are generally not sexually dimorphic and have evolved specialised morphology to match their unique lifestyle.

The beak differs from other woodpeckers in that it is mainly curved, not long and without nostril feathers. Like other woodpeckers its beak has a chisel like cutting edge. A hard rhamphotheca and complex beak microstructures strengthen the bill for pounding and drilling. The tail has evolved for support, clinging and climbing, acting as a third leg or tripod. The pygostyle (tail vertebrae) is larger for strong tail muscles to be inserted and it is more or less stiff. There are six pairs of tail feathers, the middle feathers of which have strong central shafts for extra support. The feet are zygodactyl, with scansorial abilities, and therefore adapted to climbing vertical surfaces, however, they are not as specialised as other woodpeckers for this purpose. The first toe is short, the 4th toe being shorter or of equal length to remaining two toes. Most species in this genus use a bipedal hopping movement on vertical and horizontal surfaces. Claws have evolved for climbing.

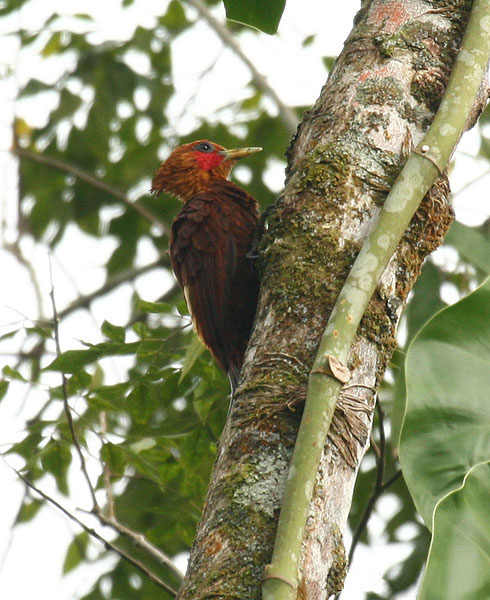
Male chestnut-colored woodpecker (Celeus castaneus), Costa Rica

Celeus species use their tongue to capture food. The tongue is long and capable of lateral movements. Due to its length the tongue does not have the usual tongue retractor muscle found in most birds, instead, there is an elongated tongue muscle (the Branchiomandibularis) along with bones of the hyoid horn, which provide increased tongue protraction. Retraction of this long tongue may find it wrapped around an eye socket between the skull and the skin.

Head crests are bushy, shaggy or peaked in typical woodpecker style and, along with flight and body feathers, are chestnut colours of brown, black and cream (some almost yellow). There is a greater or lesser degree of barring (bars or stripes of feather colour) and sexual dimorphism badges are mainly between the bill, eye and chin of males. These sexual badges are usually red. The oil gland is particularly large in this genus. Plumage convergence has been noted in divergent lineages possibly as a form of territorial mimicry but no real conclusions have been made as yet.

== Distribution and habitat ==
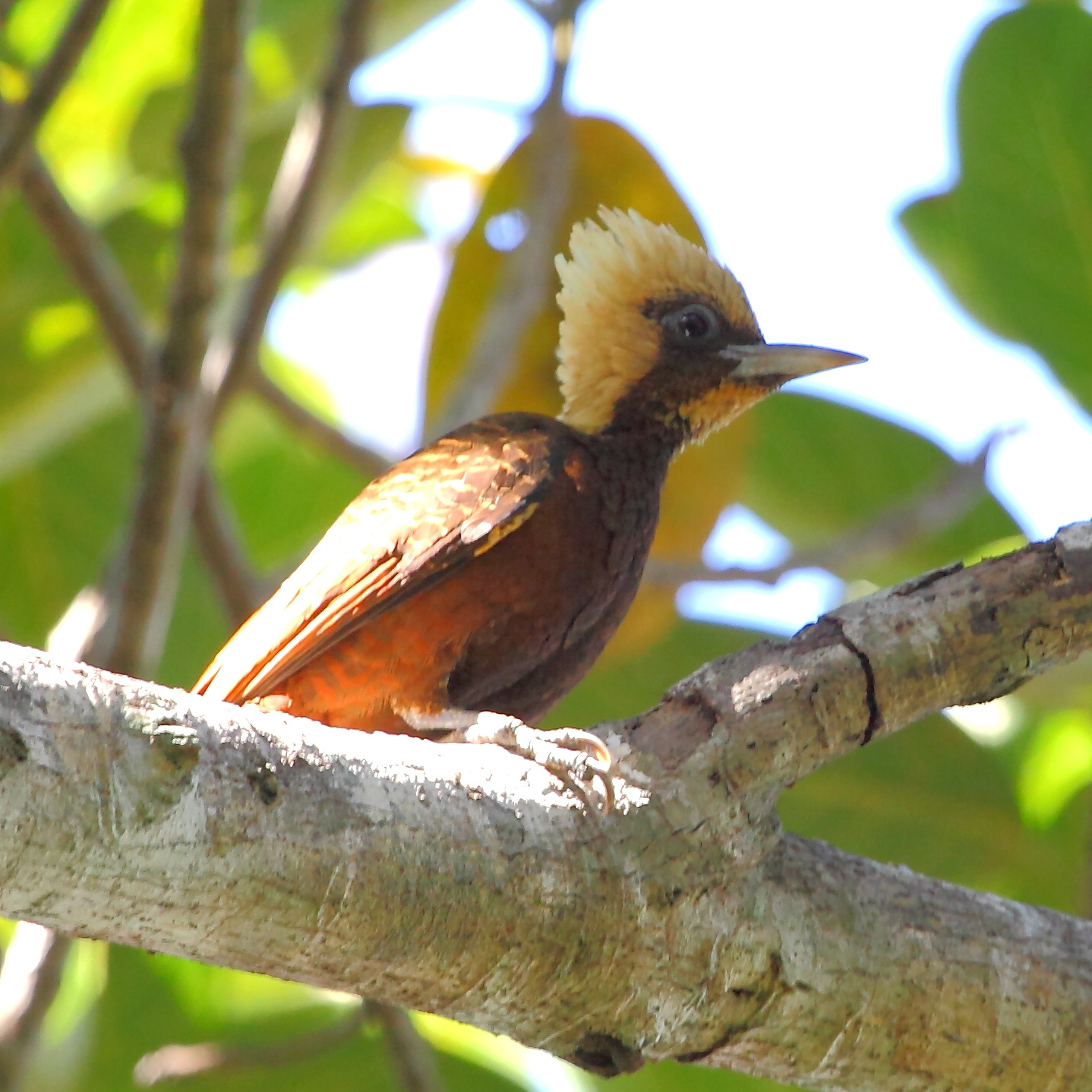
Pale-crested woodpecker (Celeus lugubris)

The ringed woodpecker (Celeus torquatus), the chestnut woodpecker (Celeus elegans) and the cream-colored woodpecker (Celeus flavus) are distributed widely throughout northern South America with remaining species having smaller ranges from Central, Southern and Eastern America to West Panama. The Amazon basin contains the greatest species diversity of the Celeus genus. Celeus species inhabit diverse environmental regions and conditions from moist lowland forests and forest edges, swamps, heavily degraded woodlands and some species are found in Savannas. Of note the pale-crested woodpecker (Celeus lugubris) prefers dry Chaco woodland, semi decayed forests and Cerrado woodlands whilst the rufous-headed woodpecker (Celeus spectabilis) and Kaempfer's woodpecker (Celeus obrieni) favour bamboo forests. Species range from sea level to 1,100 m (3,600 ft).

== Behavior and ecology ==
=== Feeding ===
Celeus filled an ecological niche of ant and termite foraging. Most are diurnal foragers whilst the helmeted woodpecker (C. galeatus) has been noted to be crepuscular. Diet varies between species but may include arthropods, larvae of wood boring insects, ants and termites, plant material, fruit and berries, nectar and sap. Some species of Celeus will sympatrically forage, with other species, as competition for their food is limited due to their specialised foraging strategies. The rufous-headed woodpecker ( C. spectabilis) and Kaempfer's woodpecker (C. obrieni) feed on ants from bamboo canes. Finding prey is by optical cues or sounds made by probing taps. Celeus are similar to other Picidae genera in their use of anvils and tools for food preparation. Forks in trees (anvils) have been used by this genus to hold food for preparation e.g. removal of stones from cherries. Some cache food in the anvil area.

Feeding maneuvers include probing using the beak and tongue, pecking for exploration and excavation, chiseling, prying or levering to obtain food. Celeus will use body maneuvers such as gleaning, reaching and hanging to access food. Hammering or continuous pecking may be associated with food finding. Weather protected cavity roosts, and, a stable supply of ants and bark insects make feeding throughout the year possible. Some Celeus will feed terrestrially and this is considered a secondary evolutionary adaptation. Faeces is typically hook shaped. Celeus are frequent drinkers obtaining water mainly from small puddles in tree forks but are also known to go to the ground for water.

=== Interspecies interactions ===
Celeus will interact with other species usually through defending nests, but also as a means of increasing foraging success. Responding to other birds alarm calls reduces their need for constant vigilance.

=== Breeding ===
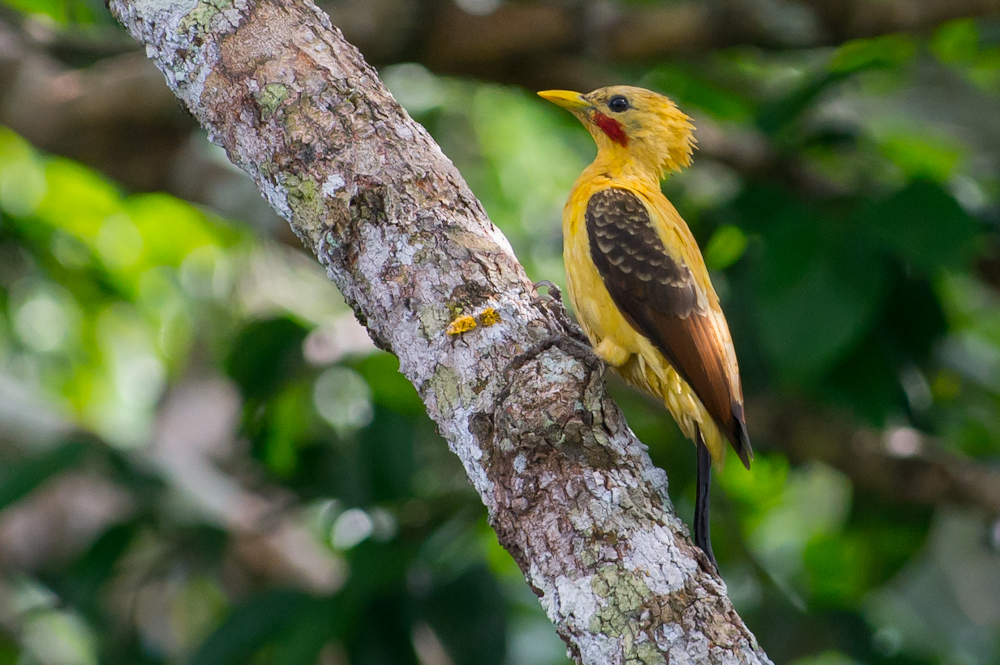
Cream-colored woodpecker (Celeus flavus)

Females of the genus Celeus are the instigators of mating courtship which usually occurs near to the nest. Courtship may commence before completion of the nest with breeding season (notably different for each species) and can range between 2–6 months. Celeus are indeterminate layers. Male contribution to nest making and brood rearing has made multi-nest polygamy difficult for this genus that is essentially monogamous. Some species of Celeus will construct nests in the nests of arboreal insects.

Eggs are usually white in colour, laid daily and can be elongated or spherical. Some species shells are thinner than others. Clutch size ranges between 2-7 eggs with hatched young blind and naked. Males usually tend to the young overnight with both parents sharing care during daylight hours. Incubation is short, usually 15 – 20 days and chicks can remain in the nest for periods of up to 30 days after hatching. Nestlings of the genus species cannot be sexed. Young will stay with parents until the following years breeding season, some remaining to help with new brood.

=== Holes and nests ===
Most Celeus, like others in the woodpecker family, have the key feature of being able to excavate a hole, for a nest, from living or newly dead hard wood trees with soft centres. This process can take up to 2 weeks. Some species excavate bamboo whilst others will nest in arboreal ant or termite nests. Trees are chosen for position, habitat and weather conditions. Funneling is commenced on the outer hard wood of the tree leading to chipping away inside the soft wood to create a cylinder. Chips of wood are either removed, from the inside of the tree, or left as nest material being removed as needed when soiled. Previously constructed nests will be revisited for nesting or retreating. Nest dimension information is limited but a 50 mm hole diameter with cavity depth 150–300 mm has been reported. Nests heights have been recorded at 0.9 m to 30 m.

=== Displays and grooming ===
Celeus display displacement movements such as tapping, pecking and drumming, intention of movement displays (e.g. looking to the side before moving away) and territorial and sexual displays. Arboreal rest and use of nest holes for retreat is common. Water bathing and sunbathing has been observed but dust bathing is rare. Celeus fluff feathers when dozing or sleeping. preening is daily with oil used from the oil gland for weather proofing feathers and protecting from skin and feather mites. Toes are groomed, and trees are used for bill cleaning. Passive and active anting has been noted in some species.

=== Headaches ===
A common question asked is why woodpeckers do not get headaches. The forces produced during beak pounding and drumming, at high-speed acceleration and decelerations, are thought to be offset by a number of factors within the bill and skull. Dense spongy cranial bones, a relatively small brain, low cerebral spinal fluid, the unequal upper and lower bills of the beak and its position in relation to the brain work together to provide shock absorbency to the brain. Beak trajectory during pounding and drilling is straight and this reduces the forces of shearing and rotation.

=== Vocalization/communication ===
Woodpecker vocalisation is thought to be genetically hardwired; different to passerines that learn song. Each Celeus species has different song types, with structure and note compositions highly simplistic. Most species are highly vocal, an exception being C. galeatus which is silent when not in breeding season. Calls range from low to loud whistling of the C. grammicus, high pitched laughing of the C. flavus, to parrot like screeches of the C. elegans. Calls from the Celeus are distinct for alarm, territorial assertion, breeding and nestling calls, and for keeping in contact with partners or others of their social group. When captured Celeus are known to scream.

Bill drumming is strident and short and is used for primary and secondary communication with mates and other species. Drumming is used for attracting a mate and maintaining a territory and can range from weak short drumming to that of the C. brachyurus whose drumming roll is between 1.5-5 sec long finishing with a rhythm of drums 2– 3 minutes apart sounding like a stalling motorbike engine. Wing use for communication can be noisy and used for mating, territorial and defence communication through visual displays of dipping or undulating. Specialised flight maneuvers often precede sexual activities. Whole body gestures or movements may be a show of wariness to approaching conflict or social communication. Head bobbing or swinging may be part of defense and mating displays. Some species of Celeus have been noted to adopt a posture of bill pointing possibly directed at an opponent.

=== Intelligence ===
Use of anvils and tools, by Celeus, for preparation and storage of food is thought to give this genus similar cognitive skills to parrots.

== Relationship with humans ==
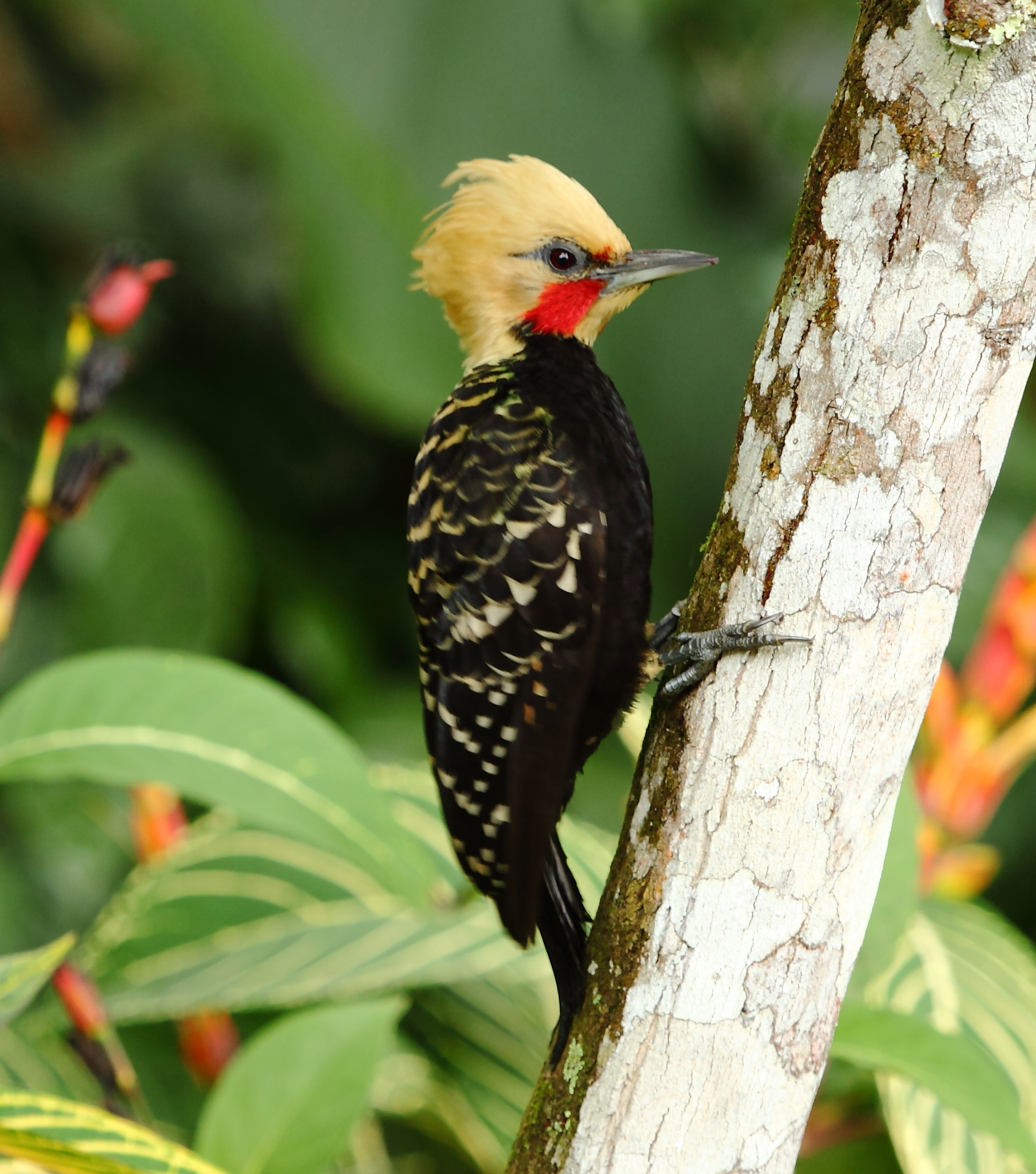
Male blond-crested woodpecker (Celeus flavescens)

Woodpeckers are usually amicable around humans, adapting to manmade environments mainly for nesting and feeding. They can be considered a nuisance when nesting activities involve agricultural damage. Utility poles, housing insulation, wood cabins, wooden houses and shutters are used by this genus often resulting in structural damage. Humans have had a large impact on this genus through extensive habitat degradation and loss and early specimen collections which may have led to declining populations. Provision of nest boxes for this species has been unsuccessful.

== Status concerns ==
Four species in the genus are on the IUCN Red List accounting for 27% of the woodpecker family. Red listed species are C. torquatus, C. obrieni, C. tinnunculus and C. galeatus. All are threatened due to deforestation, habitat degradation and fragmentation. Conservation actions are limited to surveys and some habitat protection. The helmeted woodpecker (C. galeatus) protected by law and is a flagship species for educating school children.
