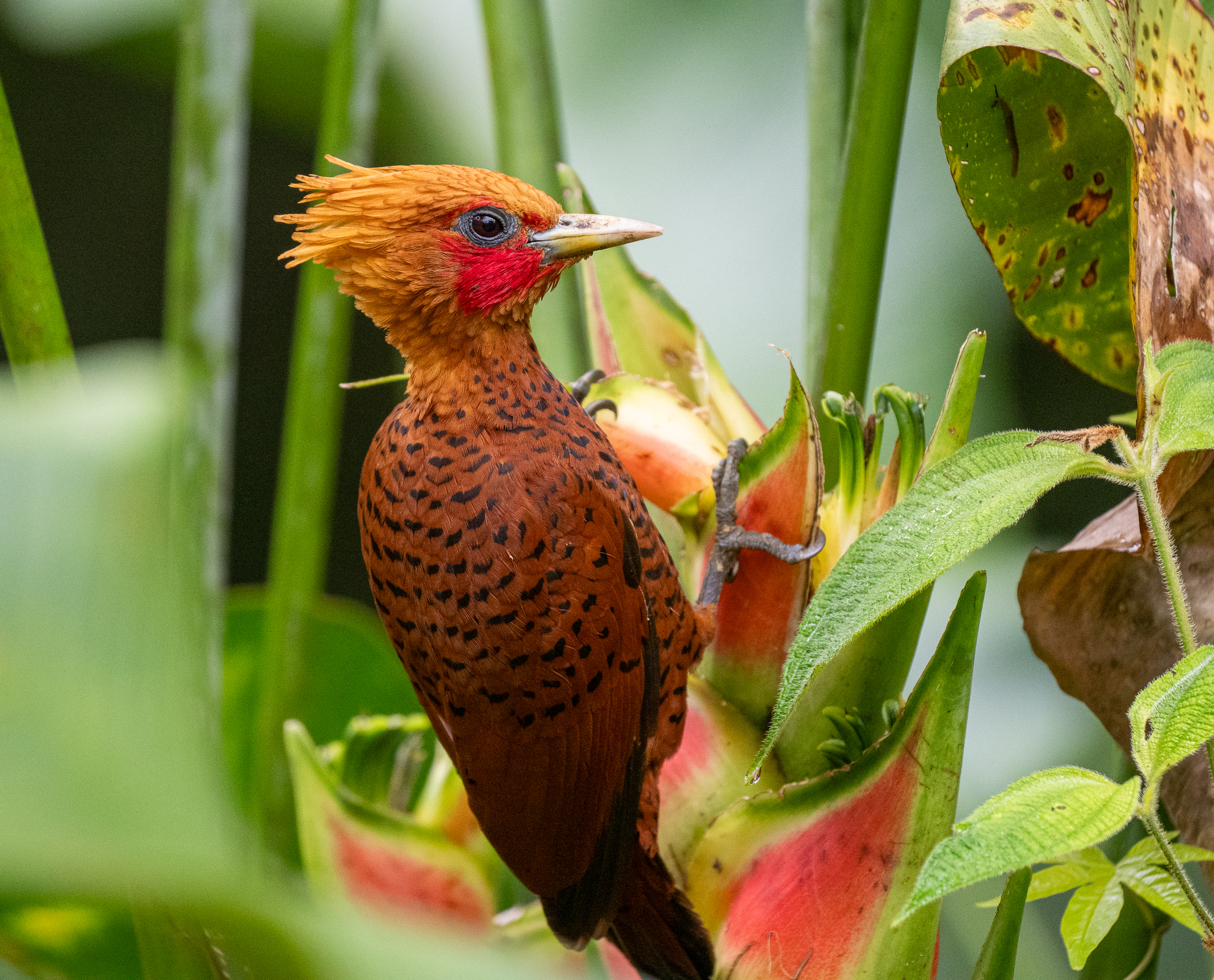

Conservation status
- Least Concern (IUCN 3.1)

Scientific classification
- Kingdom: Animalia
- Phylum: Chordata
- Class: Aves
- Order: Piciformes
- Family: Picidae
- Genus: Celeus
- Species: C. castaneus

Binomial name
- Celeus castaneus (Wagler, 1829)

= Chestnut-colored woodpecker =

Species of bird

The chestnut-colored woodpecker (Celeus castaneus) is a species of bird in subfamily Picinae of the woodpecker family Picidae. It is found in Belize, Costa Rica, Guatemala, Honduras, Mexico, Nicaragua, and Panama.

== Taxonomy and systematics ==
The chestnut-colored woodpecker is monotypic.

== Description ==
The chestnut-colored woodpecker is 21.5 to 25 cm (8.5 to 9.8 in) long and weighs 80 to 105 g (2.8 to 3.7 oz). Both sexes' heads are dull ochraceous or tawny with a pointed crest. Males are bright red from the lores to behind the eye and down to the throat; the chin and upper throat sometimes also have some red. Females have no red. Both sexes of adults have rufous-chestnut upperparts with a cinnamon-buff rump and black bars on the back and uppertail coverts. Their flight feathers are rufous-chestnut with some dusky brown tips. Their tail feathers are dull black with chestnut bases. Their underparts are chestnut heavily marked with black "V" or "U" shapes. Individuals have some variation in the intensity of the black markings, especially the bars on their upperparts. The adult's bill is ivory-yellow with a blue-green tinge at its base, their iris chestnut or garnet brown, and their legs dark olive to grayish. Juveniles are similar to adults but duller and darker overall, with dusky mottling on the malar area, and fewer and more irregular black marks on their underparts.

== Distribution and habitat ==
The chestnut-colored woodpecker is found on the Caribbean side of Middle America from southern Veracruz in Mexico south through Belize, Guatemala, Honduras, Nicaragua, and Costa Rica to just into Panama's Bocas del Toro Province. It primarily inhabits the interior and edges of humid evergreen and semi-deciduous forests but is also found in mangroves and coastal scrub in some areas. It favors dense foliage even at the forest edge. In elevation it ranges from sea level to 1,000 m (3,300 ft) in Mexico and to 750 m (2,500 ft) in Costa Rica.

== Behavior ==
=== Movement ===
The chestnut-colored woodpecker is a year-round resident throughout its range.

=== Feeding ===
The chestnut-colored woodpecker mostly feeds on ants and termites but also eats smaller amounts of other insects and fruit. It typically forages by itself though sometimes in pairs, in the canopy and subcanopy but lower at the forest edges. It seeks prey by pecking into tunnels and prying off bark.

=== Breeding ===
The chestnut-colored woodpecker's breeding season varies geographically. The available evidence points to breeding in March to June in Oaxaca, April to July in Belize, February to August in Guatemala, May and June in Nicaragua, February to May or maybe to July in Costa Rica, and May to July in Panama. Both sexes excavate the nest cavity. Few active nests have been described in detail, but most have been in a tree. One clutch contained four eggs. The incubation period, time to fledging, and details of parental care are not known.

=== Vocal and non-vocal sounds ===
The chesnut-colored woodpecker's common vocalization is "a falling skeew succeeded by a nasal keh, keh, keh." It also makes a "sharp 2-part wi-kah" and "a nasal peahh (like from a squeeze toy)". It drums a "short series of rapid hollow taps".

== Status ==
The IUCN has assessed the chestnut-colored woodpecker as being of Least Concern. It has a large range and an estimated population of at least 50,000 mature individuals, though the latter is believed to be decreasing. No immediate threats have been identified. "As is true of other forest species, Chestnut-colored Woodpecker is vulnerable to habitat loss or degradation."
