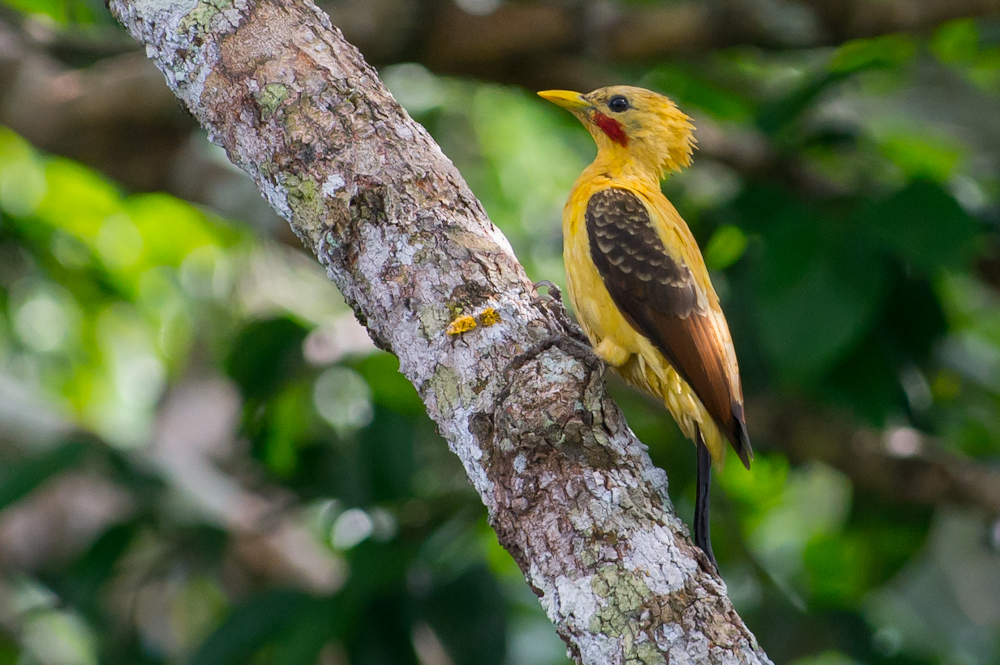
- male at Manú National Park, Madre de Dios, Peru
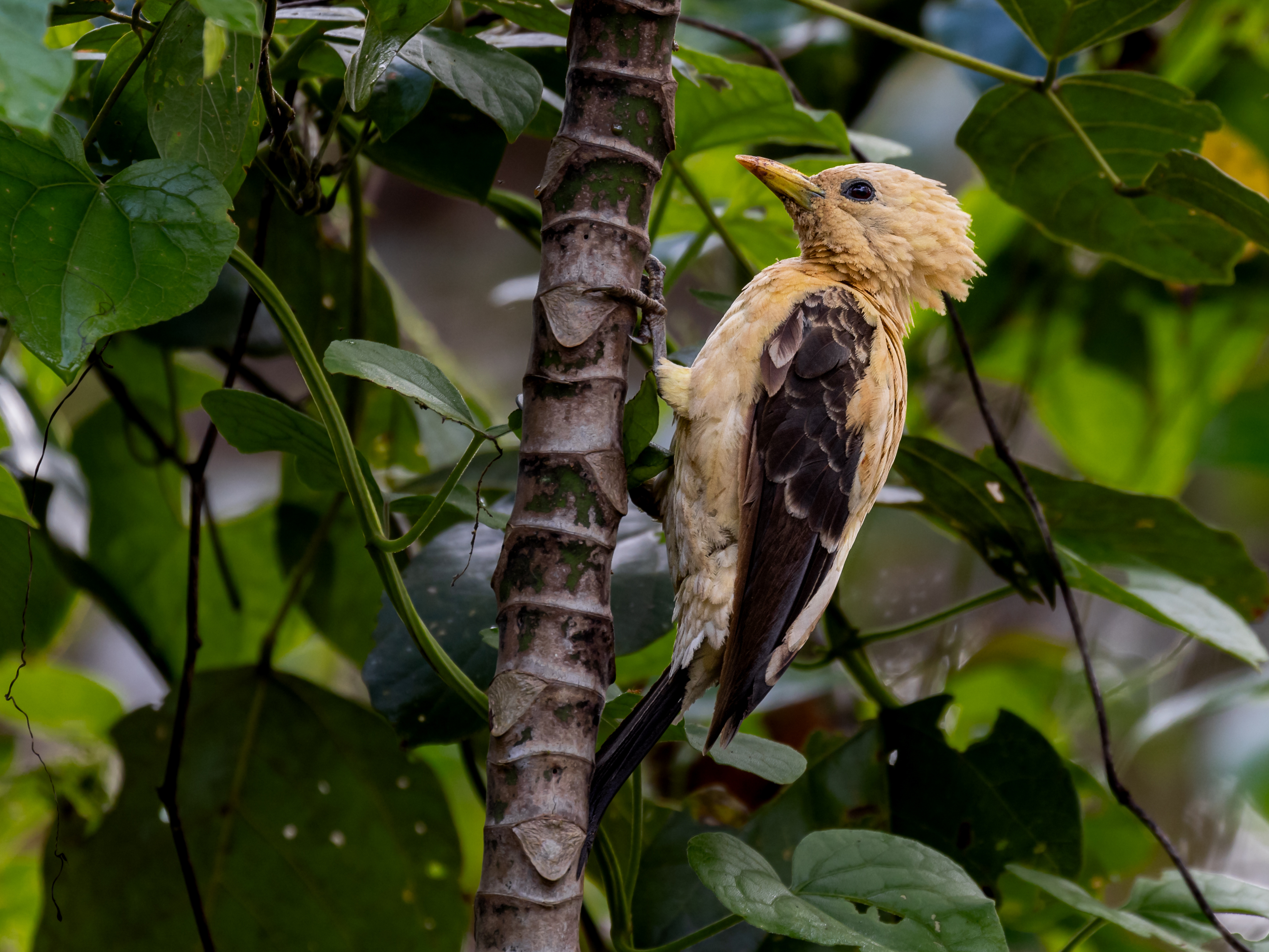
- A female at Santana, Amapá, Brazil

Conservation status
- Least Concern (IUCN 3.1)

Scientific classification
- Kingdom: Animalia
- Phylum: Chordata
- Class: Aves
- Order: Piciformes
- Family: Picidae
- Genus: Celeus
- Species: C. flavus

Binomial name
- Celeus flavus (Müller, PLS, 1776)

Synonyms
- Crocomorphus flavus

= Cream-colored woodpecker =

Species of bird

The cream-colored woodpecker (Celeus flavus) is a species of bird in subfamily Picinae of the woodpecker family Picidae. It is found in most mainland South American countries except Argentina, Chile, Paraguay, and Uruguay.

== Taxonomy and systematics ==
The International Ornithological Committee (IOC) assigns two subspecies to the cream-colored woodpecker, the nominate C. f. flavus (Statius Muller, 1776) and C.f. subflavus (Sclater, P.L. & Salvin, 1877). Until 2014 the IOC had included two more subspecies, C.f. peruvianus (Cory, 1919) and C.f. tectricialis (Hellmayr, 1922) but that year merged them into the nominate. As of early 2023 the Clements taxonomy and BirdLife International's Handbook of the Birds of the World retain all four subspecies.

The subspecies "intergrade extensively, producing numerous intermediates, and in much of range many individuals [are] impossible to assign to a particular race; geographical limits given are therefore somewhat arbitrary." Because the four subspecies do on average have plumage differences, this article follows the four-subspecies model where data for each exist.

== Description ==
The cream-colored woodpecker is about 24 to 27 cm (9.4 to 11 in) long. The nominate subspecies weighs 95 to 131 g (3.4 to 4.6 oz) and C.f. subflavus about 200 g (7.1 oz). All of the subspecies are mostly yellowish with a long crest and a black tail. The "yellowish" varies among individuals from pale creamy yellow to sulfur-yellow and occasionally is cinnamon-white. Adult males have a bright red malar stripe; females have no red. The adult's bill is yellowish, their iris red or red-brown, and their legs dark gray to green-gray. Juveniles resemble adults but are usually buffier or tending to cinnamon-buff.

The subspecies differ chiefly in size and the color of their wings. The nominate's flight feathers are brown with much rufous-chestnut and also black tertials. Its wing coverts are usually brown or rufous-brown. Subspecies C.f. peruvianus is slightly larger than the nominate, and its flight feathers replace most of the rufous with brown. Subspecies C.f. tectricialis is about the same size as the nominate, with mostly brown wing coverts and much less rufous in the flight feathers. Subspecies C.f. subflavus is the largest. Much of its body plumage has wide brown bases, its wing coverts have much yellowish, and its flight feathers have no rufous.

== Distribution and habitat ==
The four subspecies of the cream-colored woodpecker are distributed thus:

- C. f. flavus, eastern Colombia east in southwestern and northeastern Venezuela, the Guianas, and northeastern Brazil, and south through eastern Ecuador to northern Bolivia, and in western Brazil to Mato Grosso do Sul.
- C.f. peruvianus, eastern Peru
- C.f. tectricialis, Maranhão state in northeastern Brazil
- C.f. subflavus, eastern and southeastern Brazil from Alagoas south to Espírito Santo

The cream-colored woodpecker inhabits a variety of humid forest landscapes, often near water. These include the interior and edges of rainforest, várzea, and swamp forest. It occurs less frequently in gallery forest, magroves, deciduous and open woodland, and secondary forest. It also occurs in human-altered landscapes such as cacao plantations. In elevation it is mostly found below 400 m (1,300 ft) but does range up to 700 m (2,300 ft).

== Behavior ==
=== Movement ===
The cream-colored woodpecker is a year-round resident throughout its range.

=== Feeding ===
The cream-colored woodpecker's primary diet is ants and termites, and includes lesser but still significant amounts of fruits and seeds. It generally forages at the forest's lower to middle level but will feed in the canopy and on the ground. It sometimes feeds alone but usually feeds in pairs or small groups. It captures much of its ant and termite prey by breaking into their arboreal nests.

=== Breeding ===
The cream-colored woodpecker's breeding season apparently varies geographically but has not been fully defined. It nests between April and June in Colombia and maybe earlier in Venezuela; in Suriname the season includes February. Nothing else is known about its breeding biology.

=== Vocalization ===
The cream-colored woodpecker makes "a high-pitched laugh, 'wutchuk kee-hoo-hoo-hoo'", also described as "pueer, pueer, purr, paw". Other calls include "kiu-kiu-kiu-kiu" and "whéejah"; the latter is used in encounters with others of its species and may be repeated.

== Status ==
The IUCN has assessed the cream-colored woodpecker as being of Least Concern. It has a very large range but its population size is not known and is believed to be decreasing. No immediate threats have been identified. It is thought to be generally "rather uncommon" though very common in Venezuela. It occurs in several protected areas.
