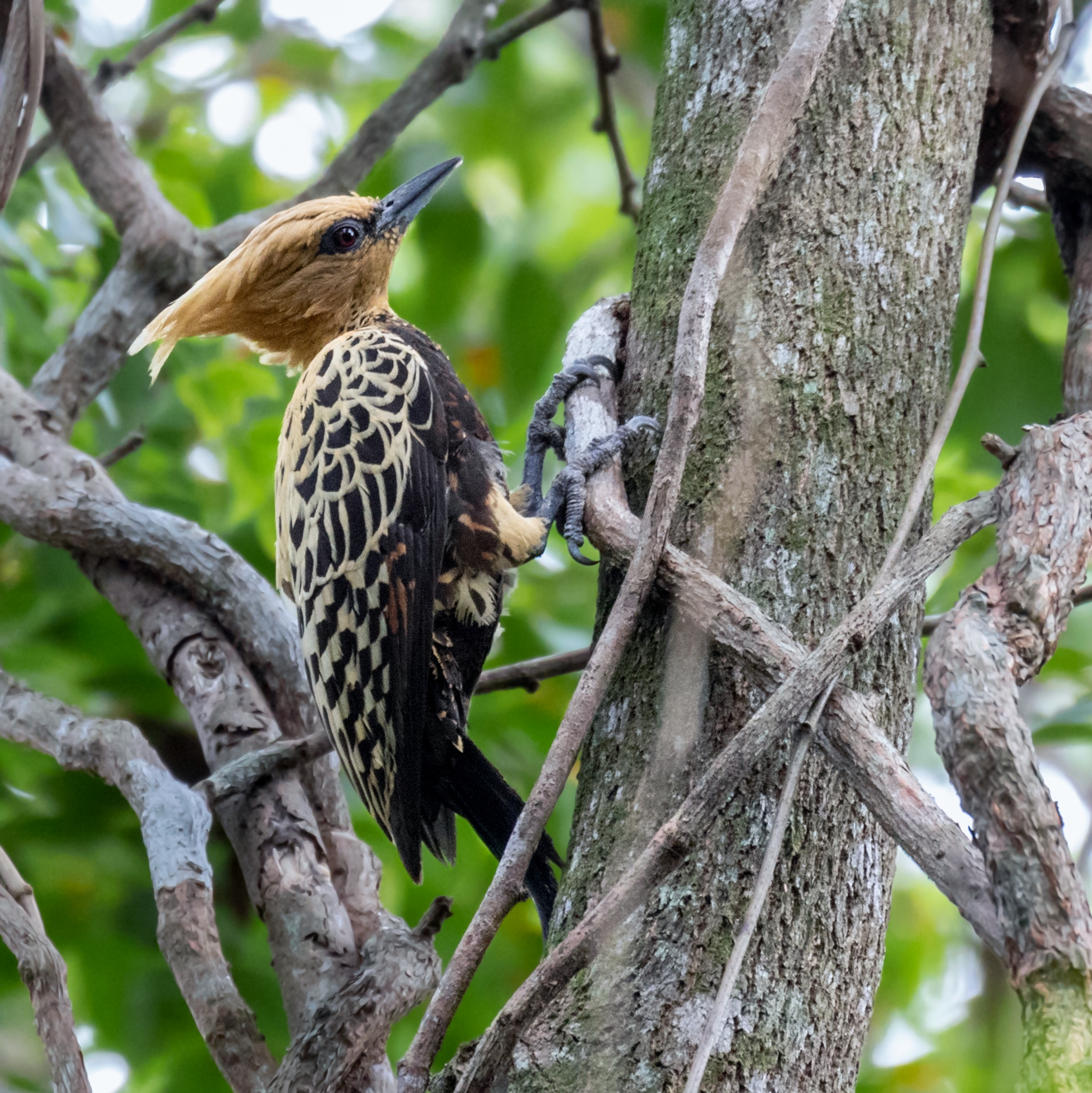
- female at Arari, Maranhão state, Brazil

Conservation status
- Least Concern (IUCN 3.1)

Scientific classification
- Kingdom: Animalia
- Phylum: Chordata
- Class: Aves
- Order: Piciformes
- Family: Picidae
- Genus: Celeus
- Species: C. ochraceus

Binomial name
- Celeus ochraceus (von Spix, 1824)

Synonyms
- Celeus flavescens ochraceus

= Ochre-backed woodpecker =

Species of bird

The ochre-backed woodpecker (Celeus ochraceus) is a species of bird in subfamily Picinae of the woodpecker family Picidae. It is endemic to Brazil.

== Taxonomy ==
The ochre-backed woodpecker was long treated as a subspecies of the blond-crested woodpecker (C. flavescens), but following a 2011 publication, regional and worldwide taxonomic systems gradually moved to accept it as a full species. The ochre-backed woodpecker is monotypic.

== Description ==
The ochre-backed woodpecker is about 25 to 27 cm (9.8 to 11 in) long. Males have a wide dull red malar area and cheek; females have a streaky black malar instead of red. Adults of both sexes have a buffy or cinnamon-tinged ochre head including the long pointed crest, chin, throat, and neck. Their upperparts are cinnamon-buff to orange-ochre with black markings that vary in shape from round to heart-like. Their flight feathers are mostly black; the secondaries have wide cinnamon-buff bars and the tertials are cinnamon-buff with black bars and tips. Their tail feathers are black with pale buffish edges or bars on the outermost pair. Their underparts are sooty, often with buff-cinnamon feather edges, and the rear flanks and undertail coverts have wide cinnamon to buff bars. The adult's bill is horn-colored or sometimes blue-gray to blackish with a paler mandible, their iris red or red-brown, and their legs blue-gray. Juveniles are similar to adults but are duller and have more brownish black on their head.

== Distribution and habitat ==
The ochre-backed woodpecker has a disjunct distribution. One population is found along the south side of the Amazon River from western Pará to the Atlantic coast. The other is further south from eastern Maranhão south to Espírito Santo and west to Goiás. It inhabits the interior and edges of humid forest and also gallery forest, savanna, caatinga, and orchards.

== Behavior ==
=== Movement ===
The ochre-backed woodpecker is a year-round resident throughout its range.

=== Feeding ===
The ochre-backed woodpecker's diet is arboreal ants, carpenter ants, termites, and lesser but still significant amounts of fruits and berries. It generally forages at the forest's middle level to its canopy but also on the ground, capturing insects by gleaning, probing, pecking, and hammering. It usually feeds in pairs or small groups.

=== Breeding ===
The ochre-backed woodpecker breeds between April and June. It excavates a nest cavity in a tree or an arboreal ant nest. Nothing else is known about its breeding biology.

=== Vocal and non-vocal sounds ===
The ochre-backed woodpecker's calls include a loud "tsew tsew", a "wee-wee-week", a "series of 'wheep' notes", and a "raucous 'wicka' or 'wícket wícket'." Its drum is a weak "roll evenly paced...repeated at varying intervals.

== Status ==
The IUCN has assessed the ochre-backed woodpecker as being of Least Concern. It has a large range but its population size is not known and is believed to be decreasing. No immediate threats have been identified. It is considered "not uncommon" but "a very poorly known woodpecker for which field studies and surveys are required."
