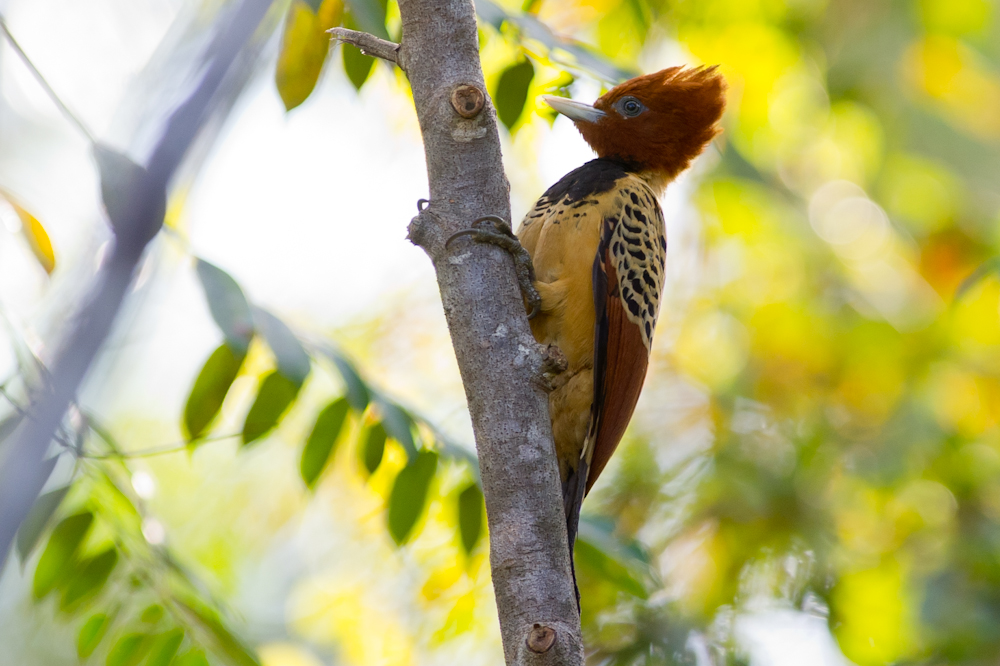

Conservation status
- Vulnerable (IUCN 3.1)

Scientific classification
- Kingdom: Animalia
- Phylum: Chordata
- Class: Aves
- Order: Piciformes
- Family: Picidae
- Genus: Celeus
- Species: C. obrieni

Binomial name
- Celeus obrieni Short, 1973

= Kaempfer's woodpecker =

Species of bird in Brazil

Kaempfer's woodpecker (Celeus obrieni), also known as the Piauí woodpecker and previously as the caatinga woodpecker, is a species of bird in subfamily Picinae of the woodpecker family Picidae. It is endemic to Brazil.

== Taxonomy and systematics ==
The type specimen of Kaempfer's woodpecker, a female, was collected in the Brazilian state of Piauí in 1926. It was lodged in the American Museum of Natural History but was not formally described until 1973, when Lester Short classified it as a subspecies of the rufous-headed woodpecker (Celeus spectabilis). Short recognized that the specimen's plumage differs from that of the other two C. spectabilis subspecies, that the habitat in which the specimen was collected differed from that favored by C. spectabilis, and that its occurrence was separated by about 3,000 km (1,900 mi) from that of C. spectabilis. He noted that the full range of the new subspecies was unknown and suggested that C. spectabilis had in the past had a much larger range.

What is now Kaepfer's woodpecker retained its classification as a subspecies until the early 2000s when regional and worldwide taxonomic systems recognized it as a full species based on the plumage and habitat differences and the huge separation in ranges. It was then named the caatinga woodpecker. By 2006 it was realized that the English name was based on confusion about where the type specimen had been collected. At that time it gained its current English name.

The species' English name honors Emil Kaempfer, who collected the type specimen. Its specific epithet honors Charles O'Brien, who first noted the specimen's uniqueness.

== Description ==
Kaempfer's woodpecker is 26.5 to 38 cm (10 to 15 in) long and weighs 85 to 105 g (3.0 to 3.7 oz). Both sexes have a rufous-red head with a bushy crest. Adult males have a bright red malar patch and some red behind the eye and onto the crest; females do not have any bright red. Both sexes' hindneck and upperparts are yellow to creamy buff with a few black bars on the mantle and scapulars. Their flight feathers are chestnut to reddish chestnut except the tertials, which are pale yellowish buff with a rufous tinge and a few dark bars. Their tail is black. Their throat and breast are black and the rest of their underparts pale yellowish buff, with usually a few black bars or spots just below the breast. Their bill is pale yellow or creamy, their iris black, and their legs grayish. Juveniles are overall duller, have a mostly chocolate-brown head, a reddish brown crest, and a light buffish mantle with no dark bars.

== Distribution and habitat ==
Between the 1926 collection and 2006, no other individuals of Kaempfer's woodpecker were seen and the bird was feared extinct. In October of 2006 a male was captured during mist netting in the state of Tocantins, about 350 km (220 mi) from the 1926 site. Since then at least 25 individuals have been documented and at least three overlooked specimens have been discovered. The sightings and specimens are scattered throughout an area of about 800,000 km^{2} (310,000 sq mi) in the northeastern Brazilian states of Maranhão, Piauí, Tocantins, Goiás, and Mato Grosso.

Little is known about the habitat preference of Kaempfer's woodpecker, but it appears to be associated with bamboo (specifically Guadua paniculata) growing in Cerrado and babassu palm forest.

== Behavior ==
=== Movement ===
Kaempfer's woodpecker is a year-round resident throughout its range.

=== Feeding ===
The diet of Kempfer's woodpecker appears to be mostly ants, especially those like Camponotus depressus and Azteca fasciata which are found in bamboo. It has been noted foraging singly, in pairs, and in family groups. It captures its prey by drilling holes in dry bamboo to access ant nests inside.

=== Breeding ===
Sightings of recently fledged juveniles suggest that the breeding season of Kaempfer's woodpecker begins in June or July, the start of the local dry season. Nothing else is known about its breeding biology.

=== Vocal and non-vocal sounds ===
Kaempfer's woodpecker makes a "[l]oud, upslurred squeal followed by a softer bubbling chuckle, e.g. 'skweeah kah-kah-kah-kah-kah' or 'kreear klu-klu-klu-klu-klu'." It usually drums on bamboo stems; the rolls are "fast and evenly paced [and] separated by intervals of 16–20 seconds."

== Status ==
The IUCN originally assessed Kaempfer's woodpecker as Critically Endangered, then in 2011 as Endangered, but since 2018 as Vulnerable. It has a spotty occurrence in a limited range and its estimated population of 6000 mature individuals is believed to be decreasing. "The main threats to the species are probably from habitat loss and degradation through fires, infrastructure development, pasture expansion and conversion to soya plantations." It is estimated that only about 3% of its original habitat remains, and it is "highly fragmented, with patches of cerrado woodland mostly smaller than 5 ha (10 acres)."
