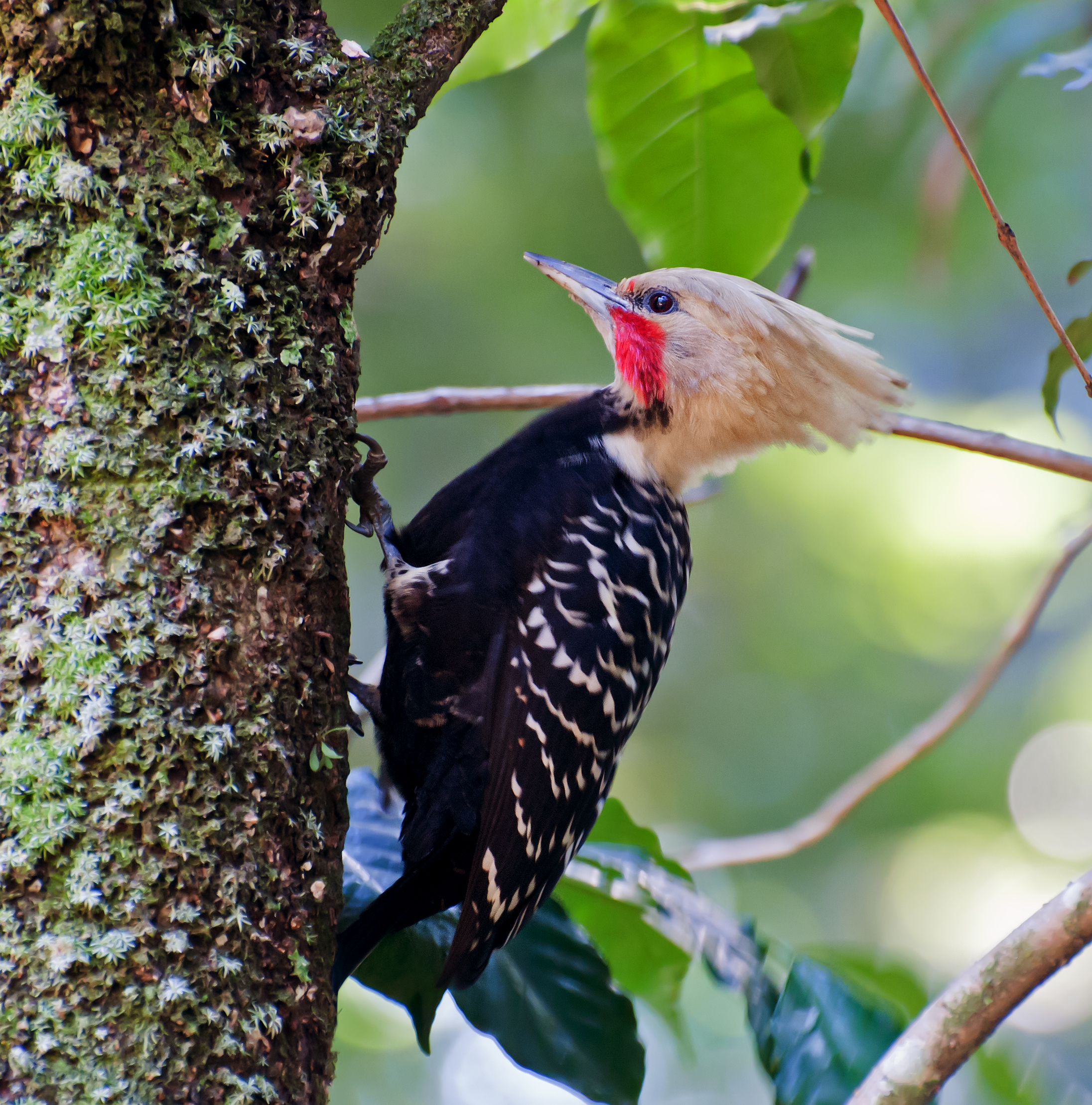
- Male in São Paulo, Brazil
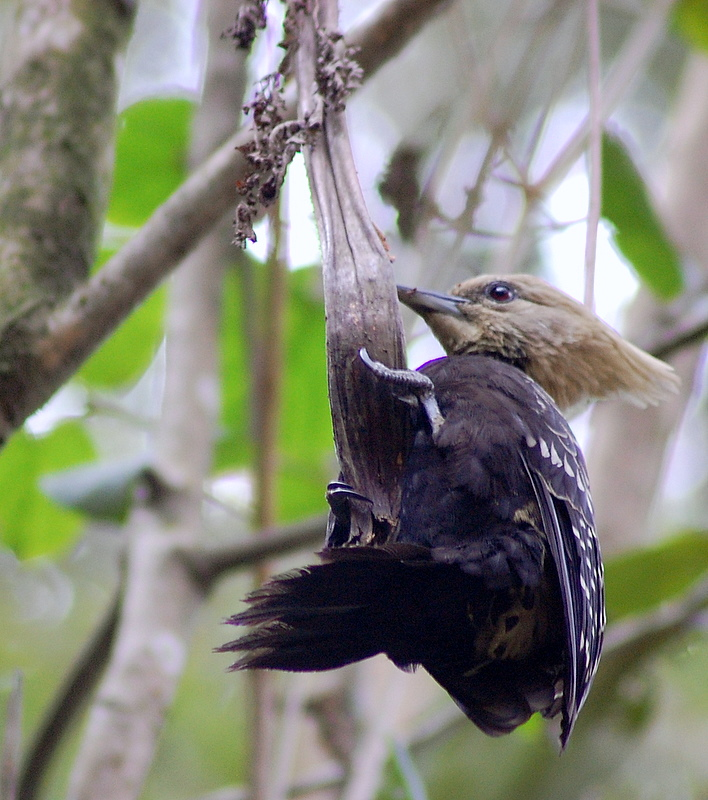
- Female

Conservation status
- Least Concern (IUCN 3.1)

Scientific classification
- Kingdom: Animalia
- Phylum: Chordata
- Class: Aves
- Order: Piciformes
- Family: Picidae
- Genus: Celeus
- Species: C. flavescens

Binomial name
- Celeus flavescens (Gmelin, JF, 1788)

= Blond-crested woodpecker =

Species of bird

The blond-crested woodpecker (Celeus flavescens) is a species of bird in the woodpecker family Picidae. It is found in Argentina, Brazil, and Paraguay.

== Taxonomy and systematics ==
The blond-crested woodpecker was formally described in 1788 by the German naturalist Johann Friedrich Gmelin in his revised and expanded edition of Carl Linnaeus's Systema Naturae. He placed it with the other woodpeckers in the genus Picus and coined the binomial name Picus flavescens. The specific epithet flavescens is Latin meaning "golden-yellowish". Gmelin based his description on the "yellow-crested woodpecker" from Brazil that had been described and illustrated in 1776 by the English naturalist Peter Brown. Thomas Pennant had provided Brown with a drawing of the bird. The blond-crested woodpecker is now one of 13 species placed in the genus Celeus that was introduced in 1831 by Friedrich Boie.

The blond-crested woodpecker has two subspecies, the nominate C. f. flavescens (Gmelin, JF, 1788) and C. f. intercedens (Hellmayr 1908). What is now the ochre-backed woodpecker (C. ochraceus) was previously included as a third subspecies.

== Description ==
The blond-crested woodpecker is about 27 to 30 cm (11 to 12 in) long. The nominate subspecies weighs 110 to 165 g (3.9 to 5.8 oz). Males of both subspecies have a wide bright red malar area and cheek; sometimes it extends around the eye and occasionally includes the lower forehead; females have black streaks instead of red on the malar and cheek and no red elsewhere. In the nominate subspecies, adults of both sexes have a pale creamy buff to yellowish white head including the long, pointed crest, chin, and throat. Often the side of the neck has black streaks. The adults have a black mantle and upper back with a buffish white to pale yellow lower back, rump, and uppertail coverts; the coverts sometimes have black bars. Their flight feathers are black with narrow white bars and some have white tips. Their wing coverts are barred black and white. Their tail feathers are black with whitish edges or bars on the outermost pair. Their lower neck and underparts are black with a hint of pale barring on the flanks and undertail coverts. Their thighs are pale yellow to buffish with black spots or streaks. The adult's bill is horn-colored or sometimes blue-gray to black with a paler mandible, their iris red or red-brown, and their legs blue-gray. Juveniles are similar to adults but are duller and have more black on their face. Subspecies C. f. intercedens is whitish to buff-white on the head and lower back, and sometimes has some rufous in the flight feathers.

The main call is a "[r]esonant loud 'tsew' or 'wee' repeated up to seven times". It also makes a "well-spaced series of 'wheep' notes", an "aggressive 'tttrrr'", and a "raucous 'wícket wícket'." Its drum is weak "evenly pitched short rolls".

== Distribution and habitat ==
The blond-crested woodpecker's subspecies C. f. intercedens is the more northerly of the two. It is found in western Bahia, Goiás, and Minas Gerais in east-central Brazil. The nominate subspecies is found southeast of it, from southern Bahia to Rio Grande do Sul and into eastern Paraguay and Argentina's Misiones Province. The species inhabits the interior and edges of humid forest and also gallery forest, savanna, caatinga, and orchards.

== Behavior ==
=== Movement ===
The blond-crested woodpecker is a year-round resident throughout its range.

=== Feeding ===
The blond-crested woodpecker's diet is arboreal ants, carpenter ants, termites, and lesser but still significant amounts of fruits and berries. It generally forages at the forest's middle level to its canopy but also on the ground, capturing insects by gleaning, probing, pecking, and hammering. It usually feeds in pairs or small groups. It is an important pollinator and disperser of seeds.

=== Breeding ===
The blond-crested woodpecker breeds between April and June in eastern Brazil and between October and November in Argentina. It excavates a nest cavity in a tree or an arboreal ant nest. Nothing else is known about its breeding biology.

== Status ==
The IUCN has assessed the blond-crested woodpecker as being of Least Concern. It has a large range but its population size is not known and is believed to be decreasing. No immediate threats have been identified. It is "generally not uncommon and locally fairly common" and occurs in several protected areas.
