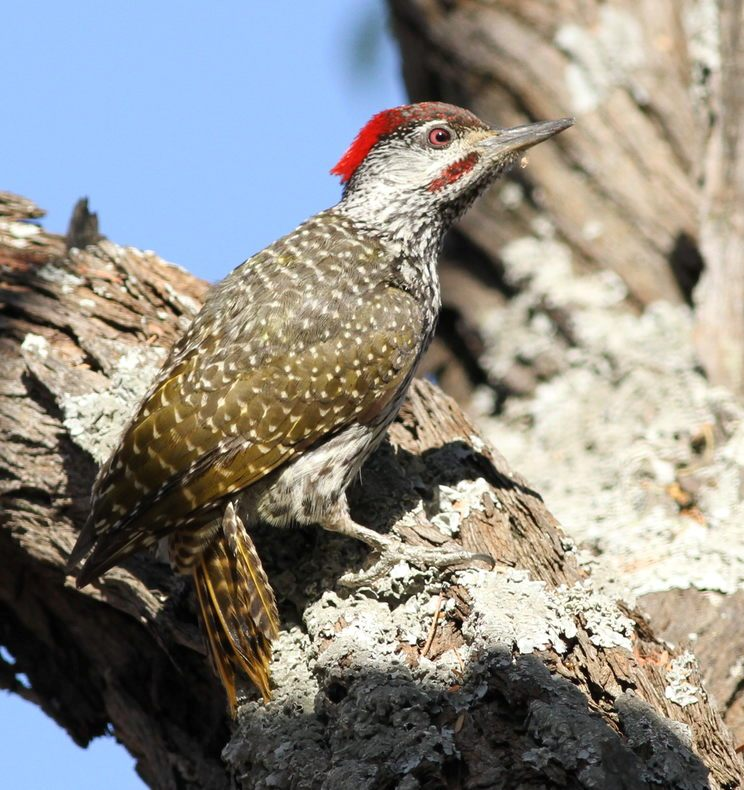
- male of the nominate race

Conservation status
- Least Concern (IUCN 3.1)

Scientific classification
- Kingdom: Animalia
- Phylum: Chordata
- Class: Aves
- Order: Piciformes
- Family: Picidae
- Genus: Campethera
- Species: C. abingoni

Binomial name
- Campethera abingoni (Smith, 1836)
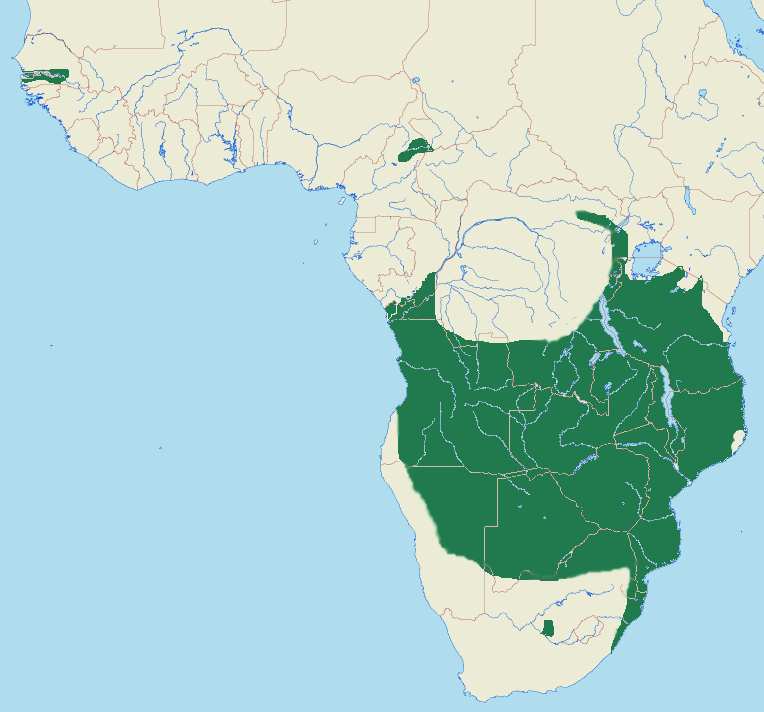
- resident range

Synonyms
- Chrysoptilus abingoni

Audio
- Call note

= Golden-tailed woodpecker =

Species of bird

The golden-tailed woodpecker (Campethera abingoni) is a species of bird in the family Picidae. Its specific name commemorates the 5th Earl of Abingdon. It belongs to a species complex that includes the Knysna woodpecker to the south of its range, and the mostly allopatric Mombasa woodpecker to the northeast, with which it perhaps hybridizes.

== Description ==
The combination of barred, greenish upper part plumage, and streaked underparts is distinctive. Their golden-olive tails do not differ markedly from those of several related or sympatric woodpecker species, but their single, strident call-note is characteristic.

It measures 20 to 21 cm from bill tip to tail tip. The southern races weigh about 70 g, but the northern race C. a. chrysura, only about 55 g. Males are on average larger and heavier than females. The sexes are best distinguished by their head markings, as the red and brown fore-crowns of males differ unmistakably from those of females that are black and spotted white. The malar stripes of males are red and that of females mottled black and white. The iris is usually dark red but variable, the mandibles slate grey, and the legs and feet greenish-olive. Juveniles are heavily streaked on the throat and breast and barred on the belly. They and have mottled malar stripes, and a brown to brownish-grey iris.

== Sound communication ==
Besides the single strident "waaa" or "weeea" call-note, usually by the male, it has a long-range and repeated yaooaak-yaaaaaak. It drums softly.

== Habitat ==
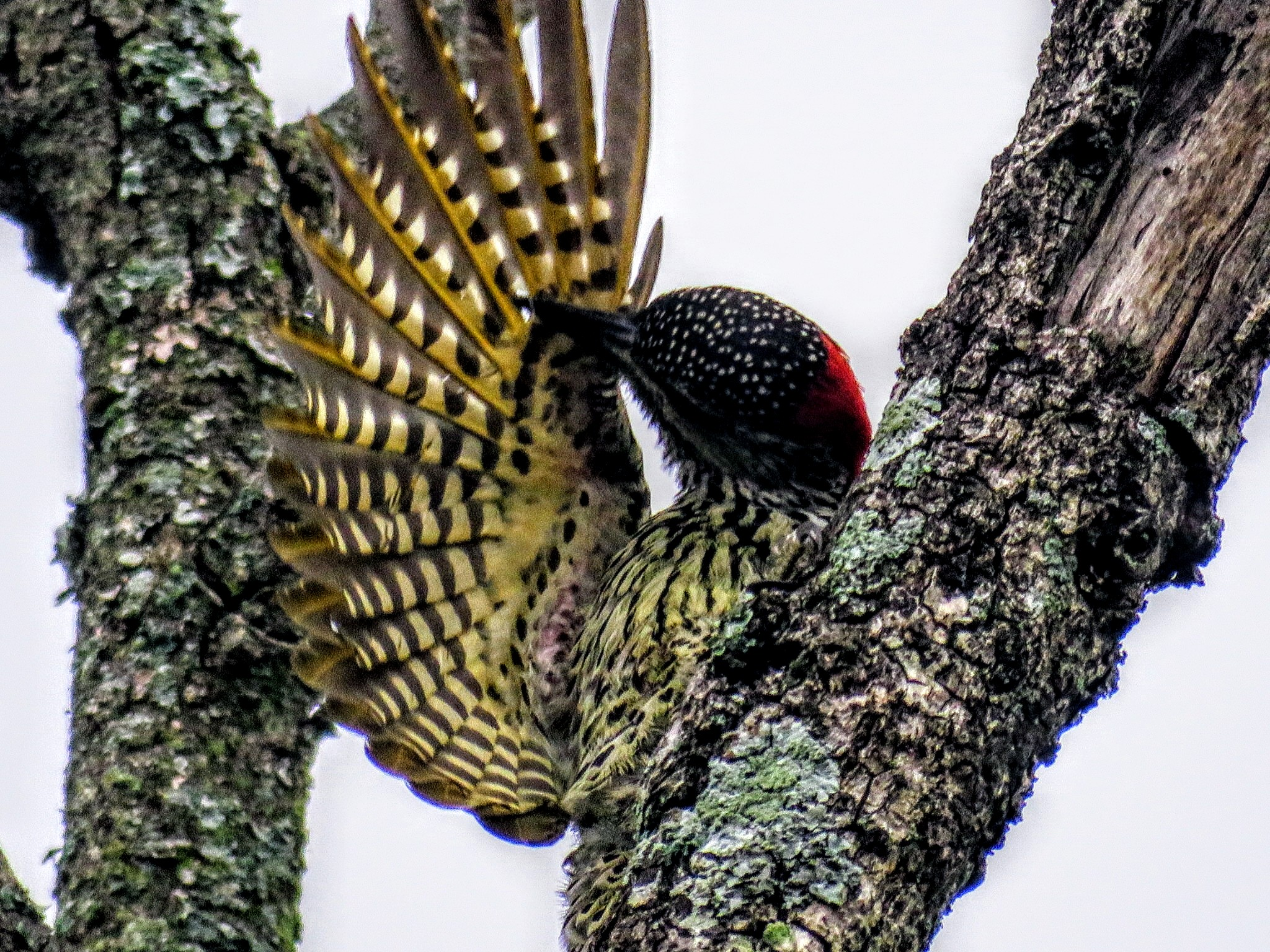
Female preening after daybreak

It is present in coastal forest, miombo, mopane and acacia woodlands. It shows a preference for riparian woodland, particularly in the dryer parts of southern Africa. It may intensively forage small areas in the lower to middle strata of trees. It establishes fairly large territories of 10 to 15 ha, and can cover some distance between foraging sites.

== Range ==
Very widespread in woodlands or forest south of the equator, and very localized north of it. It is found in Angola, Benin, Botswana, Cameroon, Central African Republic, Chad, Republic of the Congo, Democratic Republic of the Congo, Eswatini, Ivory Coast, Gambia, Ghana, Guinea, Guinea-Bissau, Kenya, Malawi, Mali, Mauritania, Mozambique, Namibia, Rwanda, Senegal, South Africa, South Sudan, Tanzania, Uganda, Zambia, and Zimbabwe.

== Feeding ==
It obtains most food by probing and gleaning, but also hammers dead or infected wood rather more frequently than other Campethera species. It feeds mostly on arboreal ants and termites, but also takes millipedes, wood-boring larvae and leaf-feeding moth larvae. It occurs alongside the Cardinal woodpecker which to some extent exploits thinner branches.

== Nesting ==
They nest during early summer. Both sexes excavate the nest, usually on the underside of a branch in the lower to middle level of a tree. Two to three glossy white eggs are laid, and the parents take turns to incubate them. The male incubates at night. The incubation period is about 13 days, and the chicks are fed regurgitated food by both parents. Chicks leave the nest after 22 to 25 days. Their nests are parasitized by various species of honeyguide.

== Races ==
There are 6 to 7 accepted races. C. a. chrysura (Swainson, 1837) occurs from Senegambia to western Uganda. It is quite green above, has streaked ear coverts and is smaller in size than either C. a. suahelica or C. a. abingoni, without overlap. The tropical race C. a. kavirondensis van Someren, 1926 is olive-green above and more broadly barred, with thinner streaking below. C. a. suahelica (Reichenow, 1902) which occurs from the Kilimanjaro region to northern Eswatini, is similar to the former but has a yellower toned upper parts. The nominate race is widespread in arid and mesic woodlands of southern Africa, and has denser throat streaking than C. a. suahelica. C. a. anderssoni (Roberts, 1936) occurs from southwestern Angola to northwestern South Africa. It has very dense throat and breast streaking, locally verging on solid black. C. a. constricta Clancey, 1965 which occurs from southern Mozambique to KwaZulu-Natal, is smaller than the nominate race, and has the upper part plumage greener and under part plumage more yellowish.

== Similar species ==
The Mombasa woodpecker has yellower plumage below, has brighter golden-green upper parts, with small white dots and no barring (and never drums). Cardinal, Bennett's, Reichenow's and Nubian woodpeckers are all browner above and more clearly barred, and only the first of these is streaked below.

== Gallery ==
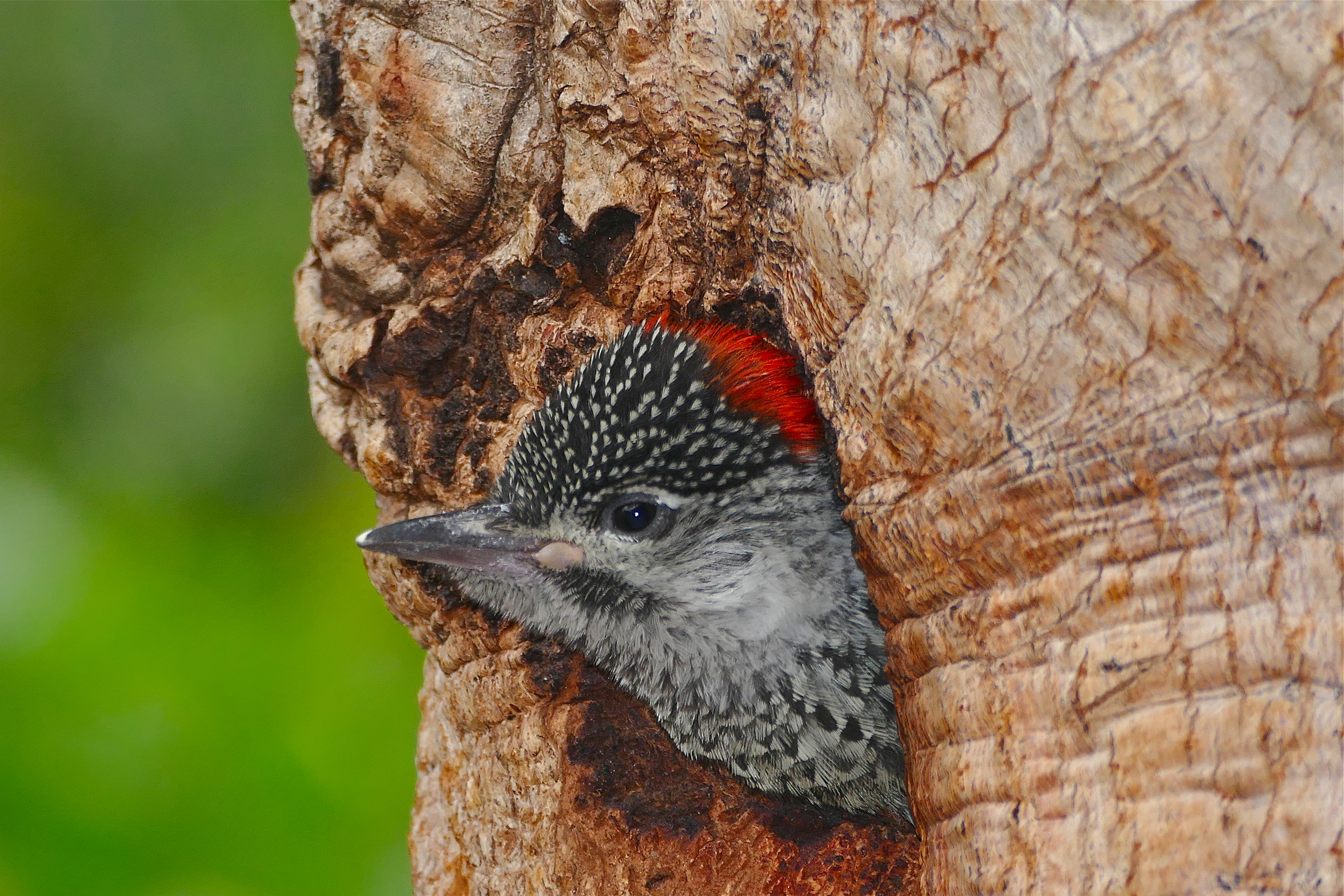
Juvenile peeking from nest cavity

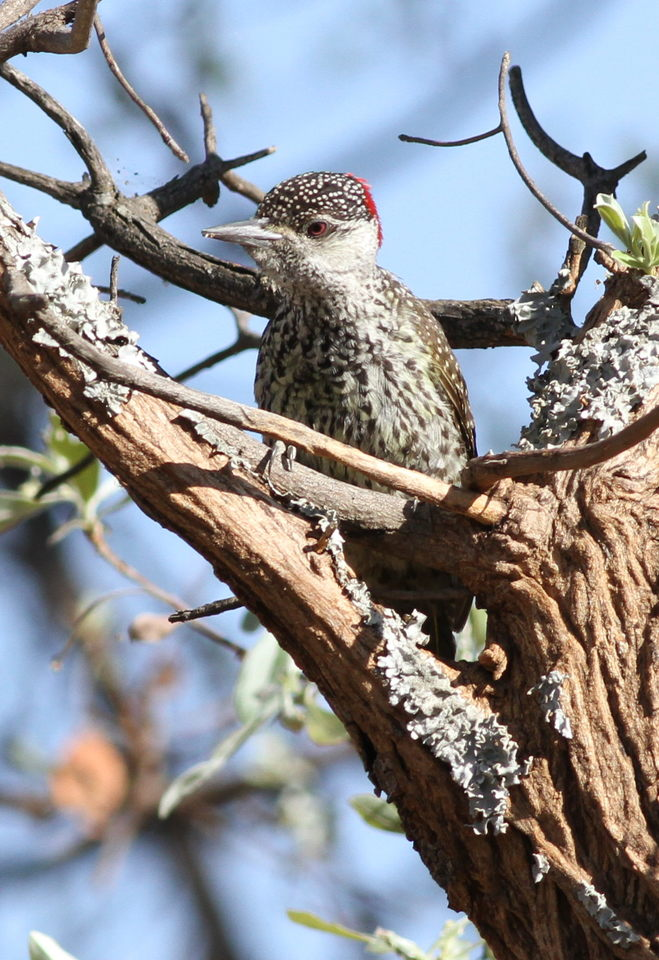
female of the nominate race

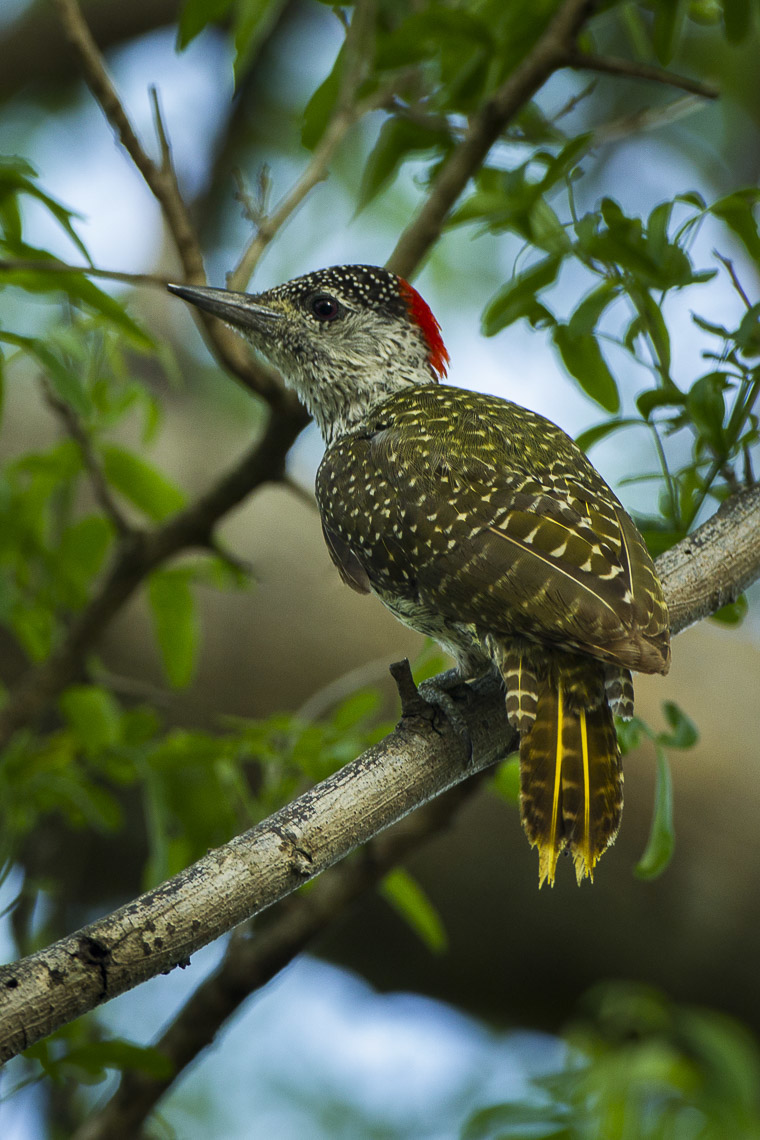
female C. a. constricta in South Africa

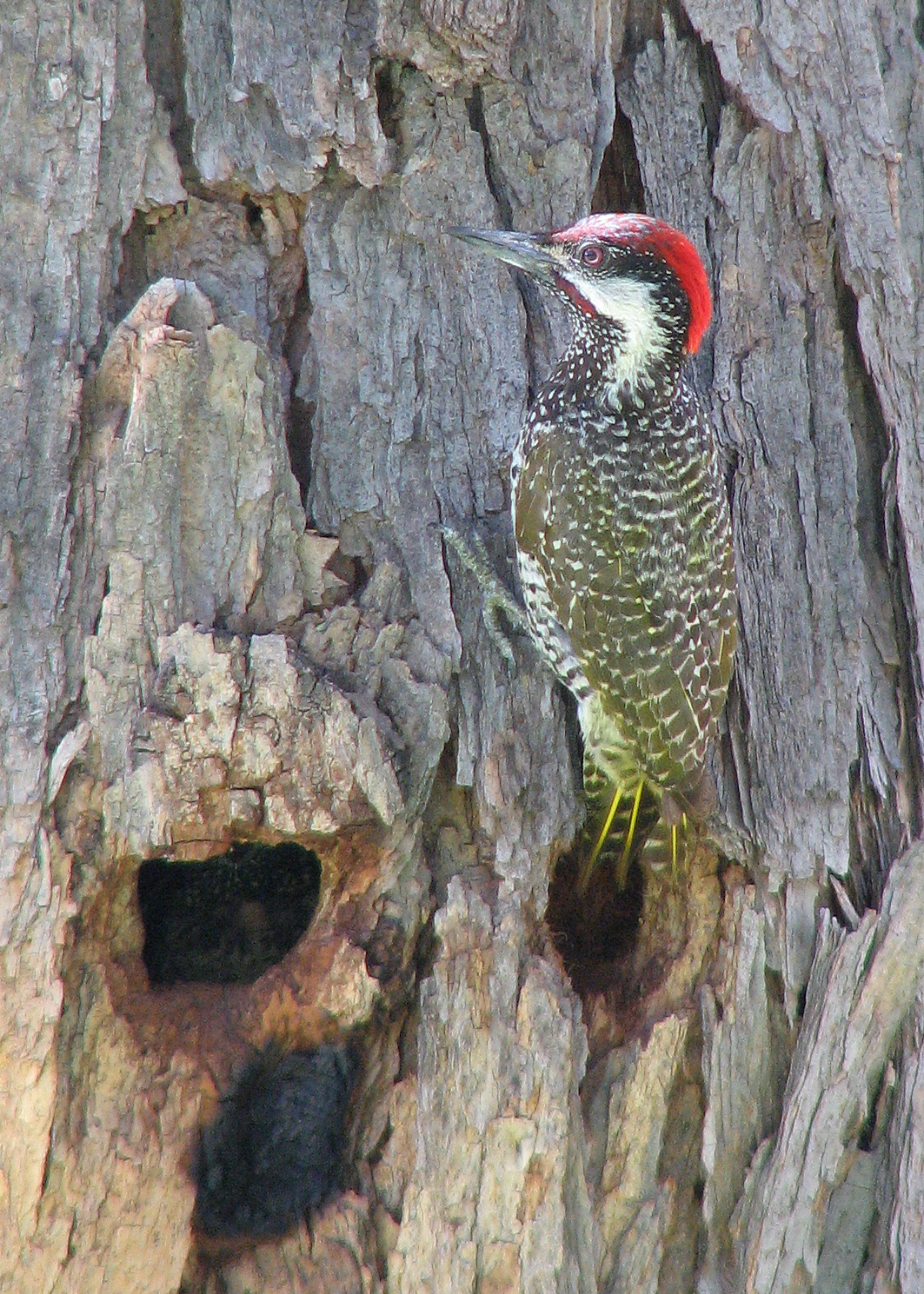
male C. a. anderssoni in Namibia
