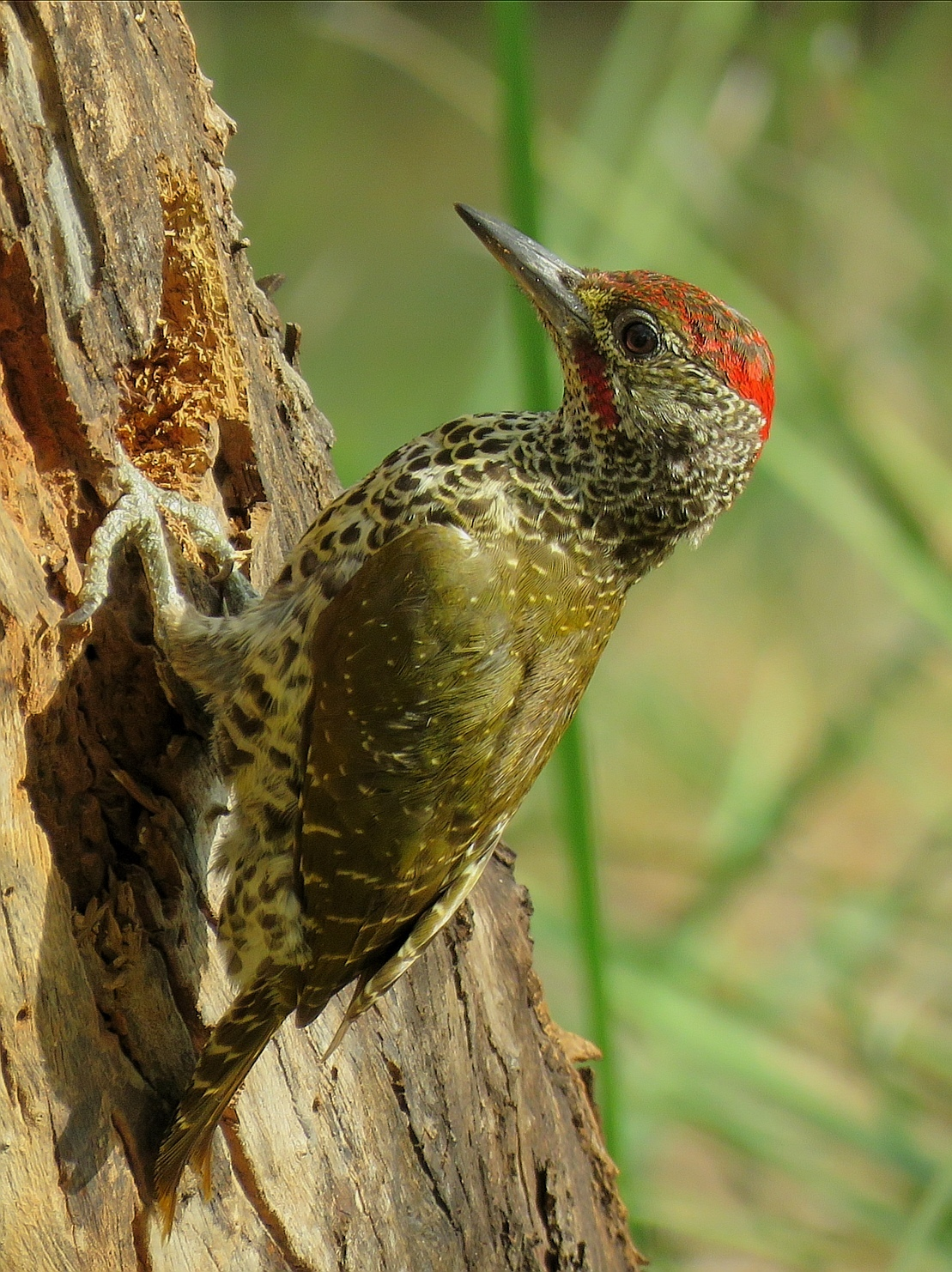
- Campethera notata, Addo Elephant National Park, South Africa

Conservation status
- Near Threatened (IUCN 3.1)

Scientific classification
- Kingdom: Animalia
- Phylum: Chordata
- Class: Aves
- Order: Piciformes
- Family: Picidae
- Genus: Campethera
- Species: C. notata

Binomial name
- Campethera notata (Lichtenstein, MHC, 1823)
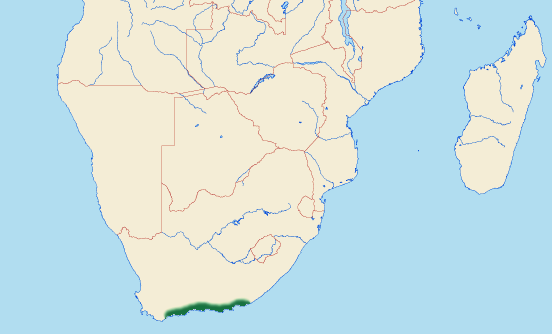
- resident range

= Knysna woodpecker =

Species of bird

The Knysna woodpecker (Campethera notata) is a species of bird in the family Picidae. It is endemic to South Africa, where its natural habitats are subtropical or tropical moist lowland forests, moist savanna, and subtropical or tropical moist shrubland. It is threatened by habitat loss. It belongs to a species complex that includes the golden-tailed and Mombasa woodpeckers.

== Description ==
This species is distinguished from the other South African woodpeckers by its thickly spotted under-surface which is covered with black spots from the chin to the vent. Males and females differ slightly. Males have an olive-green color above with indistinct, small transverse bars and a few diamond-shaped sub-terminal spots that are a paler olive-yellow. The female Knysna woodpecker is similar to the male, but the black head is spotted with white and only the occiput is scarlet.

The quills are brown, except for near the base where they are externally olive. The secondary quills are olive-brown, duller than the back, and transversely barred with a yellow-tinged white. The primaries are externally spotted with yellow, notched on the inner web with white, and the shafts are brown. The tail is olive-brown shaded with an almost green color and crossed with six bars of an almost yellow color. The tips of the feathers are a dull golden, while the shafts are golden brown.

Its head is a gray-black color and all of the feathers on it are tipped with scarlet. The occipital crest (located at the base of the cranium) is completely bright scarlet in color. Its lores are yellowish and minutely spotted with black. The ear-coverts are whitish and streaked with black, while the foreparts of its cheeks are scarlet. The rest of the sides of its face and neck are yellowish white, thickly mottled with black. The feathers in this area are black with a narrow whitish edging.

The underside of its body is yellowish, but white on the throat, and, as mentioned above, thickly spotted. These spots are rounded and very large on the breast, but more diamond-shaped on the abdomen. Its flanks are barred with dusky black and the underwing coverts are yellow with black round spots as on the breast.

Its eyes are hazel colored. Approximate length is 8.5 in (22 cm).

== Feeding and foraging ==
The Knysna woodpecker feeds mainly on ants and ant larvae, as well as wood-boring beetles and termites, including their eggs and pupae. It forages at all levels of the tree canopy, pecking, gleaning and probing in search of prey as it works its way along branches.

== Reproduction ==
Breeding takes place in August–November (mainly October) and the pairs are widely spaced. The nest hole is excavated in a dead tree trunk or branch. It has a clutch size of 2–4 eggs, which it incubates for 13–21 days, followed by a fledgling period of 4–6 days.

== Distribution and habitat ==
The Knysna woodpecker is endemic to South Africa. It is thinly dispersed across the coastal lowlands of South Africa and extends north into southern KwaZulu-Natal and west to near Bredasdorp, Western Cape. This species is common locally, but not over its entire coastal range. The total range is less than 50,000 km^{2} (19,000 sq mi) and its total population has been estimated at 1,500–5,000 individuals, of which 1,000-3,300 are assumed to be mature birds.

=== Conservation status and threats ===
Although the Knysna woodpecker has not yet been classified as endangered, the IUCN Red List lists them as Near Threatened as of 2012. Habitat shifting and alteration are predicted to occur in the future, affecting more than 90% of the population and causing rapid decline. A range contraction in KwaZulu-Natal in the 19th century has been attributed to the clearance of coastal bush for sugar-cane farming and township development. Some conservation actions, such as increasing knowledge and understanding about this species are already underway. For example, an estimated 1,000-1,500 individuals are thought to occur in reserves with these objectives like the Oribi Gorge Nature Reserve. Additionally, some proposed actions include: conducting surveys to estimate the total population size, monitoring population trends through regular surveys, carrying out research into factors that possibly limit the species' population, and increasing the area of suitable habitat with protected status.
