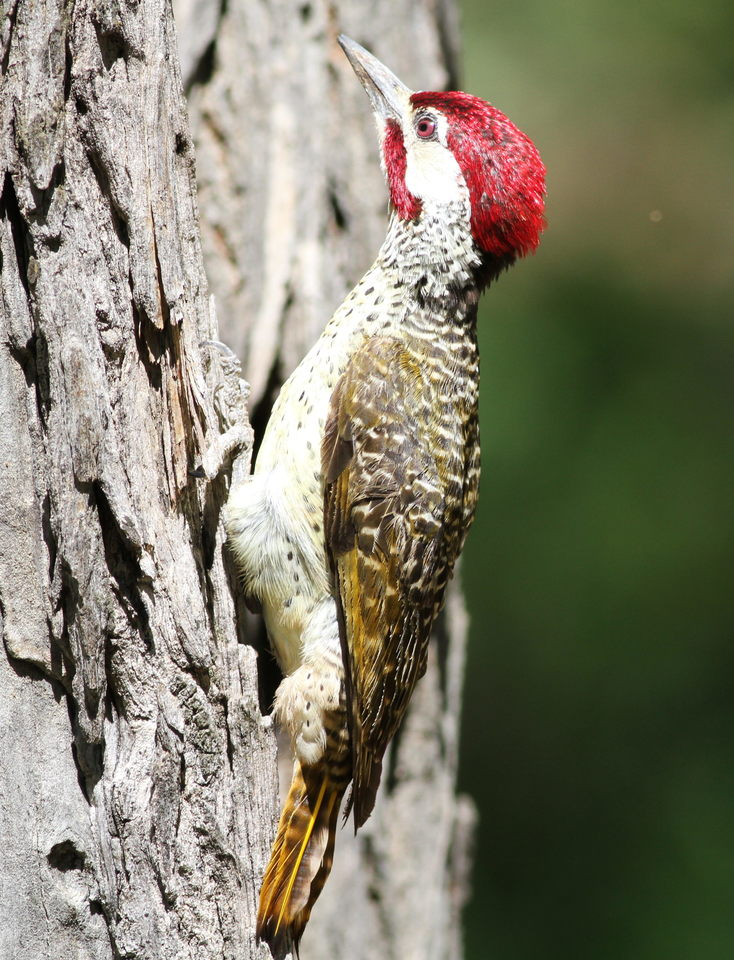
- male

Conservation status
- Least Concern (IUCN 3.1)

Scientific classification
- Kingdom: Animalia
- Phylum: Chordata
- Class: Aves
- Order: Piciformes
- Family: Picidae
- Genus: Campethera
- Species: C. bennettii

Binomial name
- Campethera bennettii (Smith, 1836)
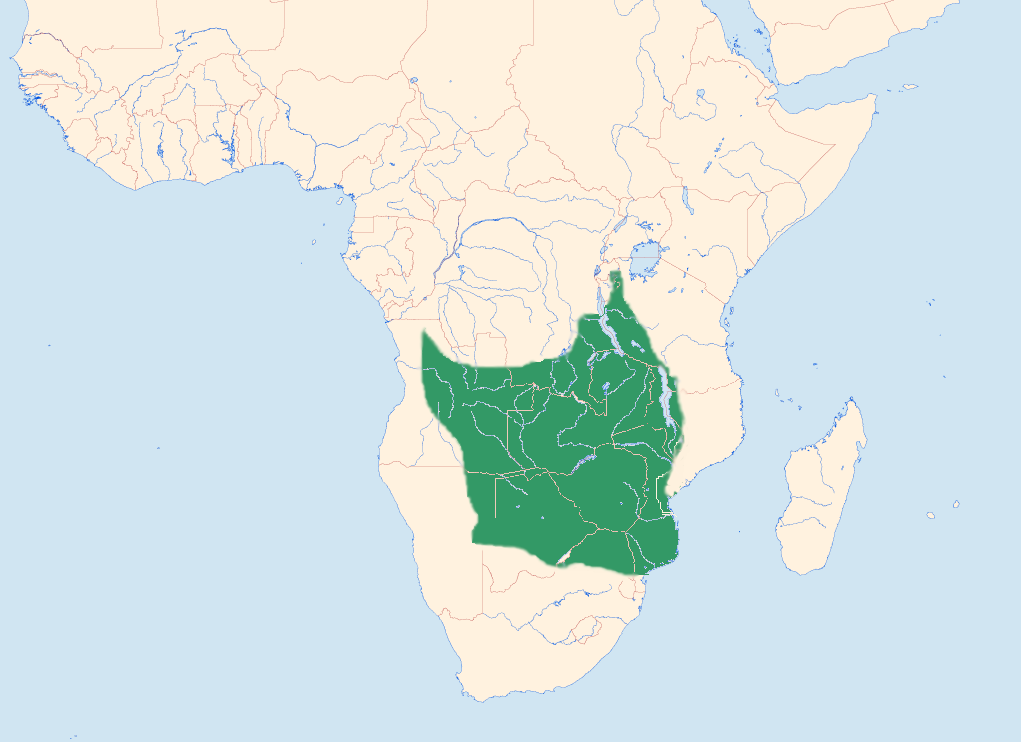
- Year-round range

= Bennett's woodpecker =

Species of bird

Bennett's woodpecker (Campethera bennettii) is a species of bird in the family Picidae. It is found in woodlands and bushes in Africa. The International Union for Conservation of Nature (IUCN) has assessed it as a least-concern species.

== Taxonomy ==
This species was described by Andrew Smith in 1836. Two subspecies are recognised: Campethera bennettii bennettii and C. b. capricorni. The common name and Latin binomial commemorate the British naturalist Edward Turner Bennett. Bennett's woodpecker, the fine-spotted woodpecker, the Nubian woodpecker and the speckle-throated woodpecker form a superspecies.

== Description ==
Bennett's woodpecker is about 24 cm (9.4 in) long and weighs 61–84 g (2.2–3.0 oz). The male's forehead, crown and nape are red. The chin and throat are white. The upperparts are brown, yellow and white. The underparts are pale yellow, and there are dark spots on the breast and flanks. The eyes are red, the beak is grey, and the legs are bluish-green or grey-green. The female has a black forehead with white spots, and its ear coverts and throat are brown or blackish-brown. The juvenile bird has a black forehead and crown and darker upperparts. The subspecies capricorni is slightly larger, and its underparts have a deeper colour and fewer spots.

== Distribution and habitat ==
This woodpecker is found in Angola, Botswana, Burundi, Democratic Republic of the Congo, Eswatini, Malawi, Mozambique, Namibia, Rwanda, South Africa, Tanzania, Zambia, and Zimbabwe, and it has a patchy distribution. Its habitat is woodlands and bushes, including miombo, Baikiaea, Acacia and mopane woodlands.

== Behaviour ==
Bennett's woodpecker is found singly, in pairs or in family groups. It mostly forages on the ground, either bare or with short grass, and also feeds in trees. It mostly eats ants and termites, including their eggs. Its calls include chuur notes, a series of wi-wi-wi-wi, kee-kee-kee or ddrahh, ddrahh, ddray-ay, ddray-ay, and a chattering wirrit-wirrit. Breeding occurs from August to February. The woodpecker excavates or reuses holes in trees. Three eggs are laid and then incubated for 15 to 18 days.

== Status ==
The species has a stable population and there is no evidence of substantial threats, so the IUCN has assessed it as a least-concern species.

== Gallery ==
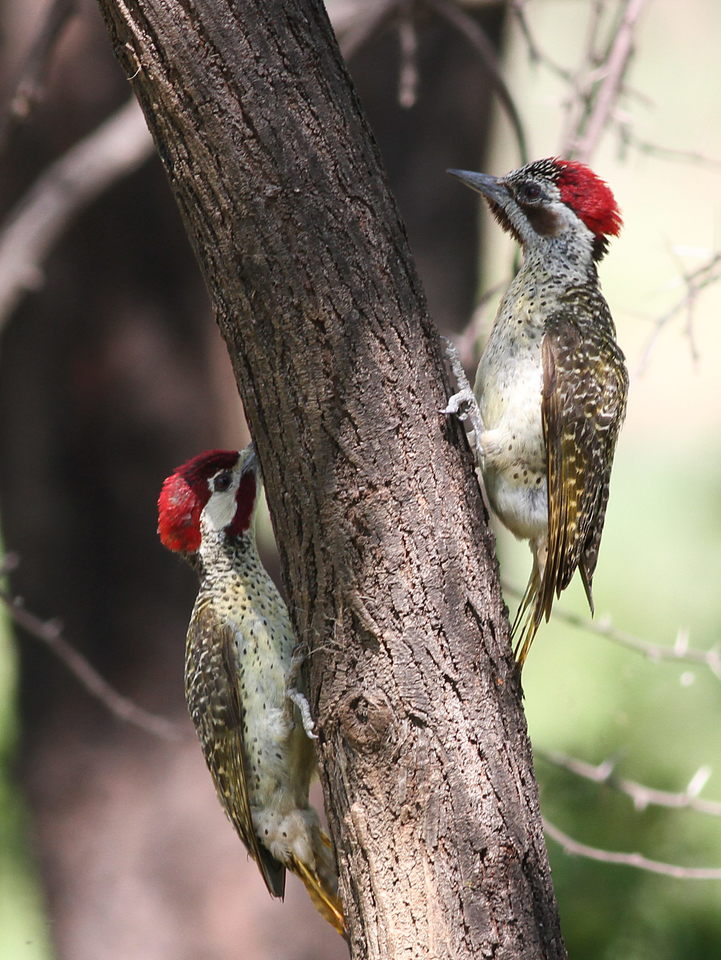
A pair (male at left)

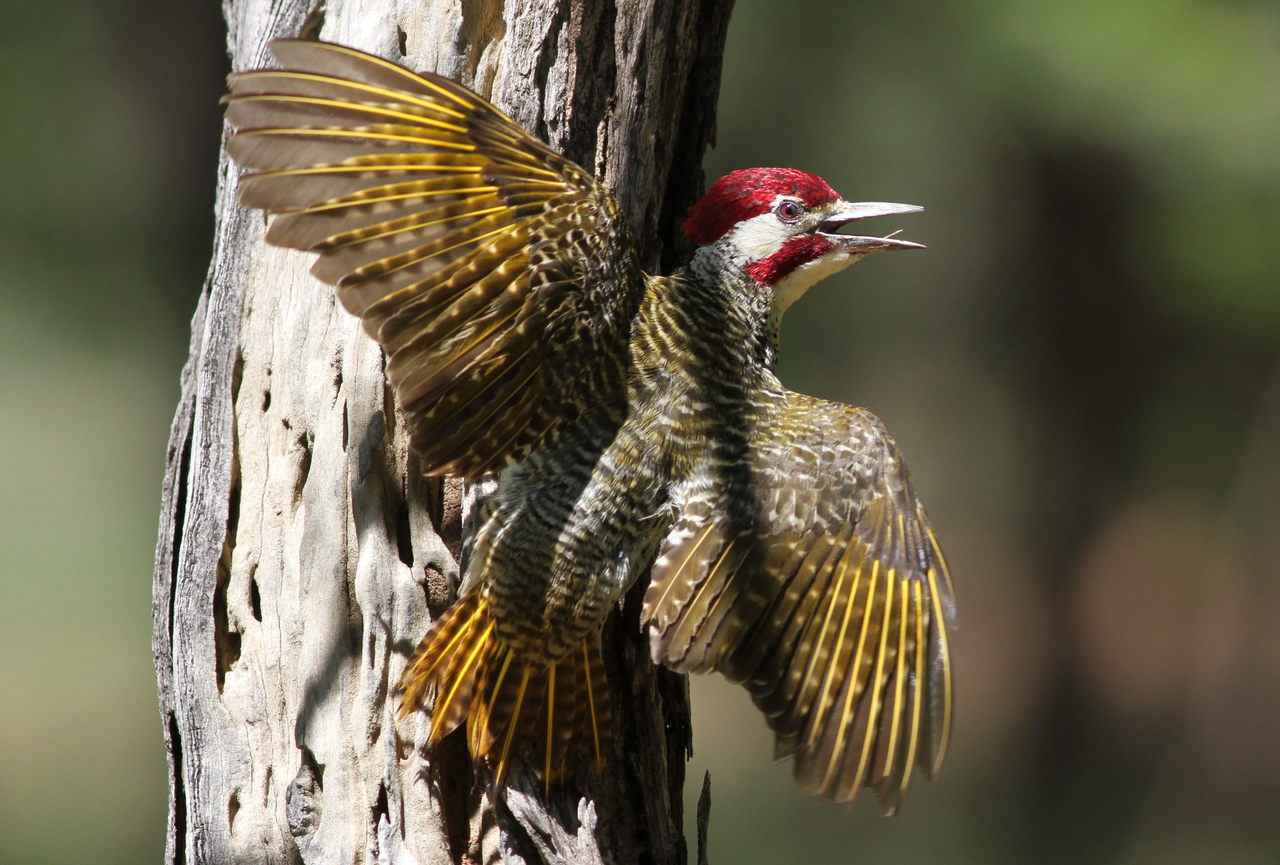
Male, revealing the yellow remige and rectrice shafts typical of genus

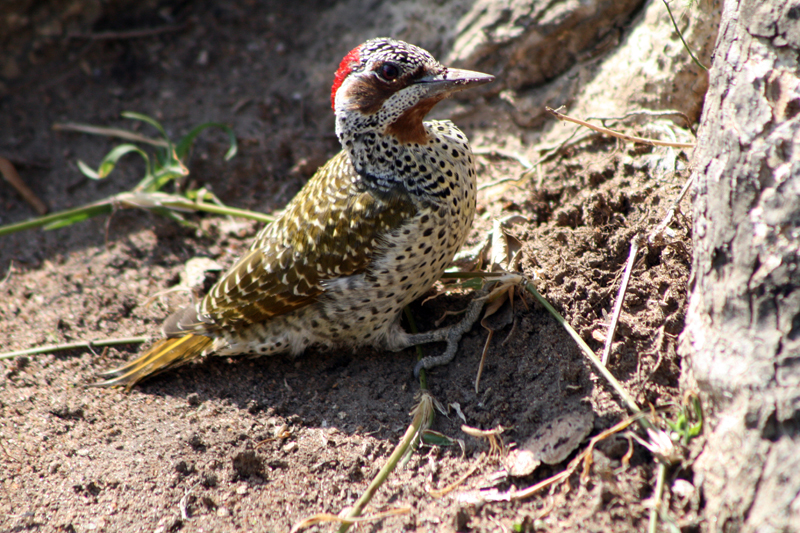
Female foraging on the ground

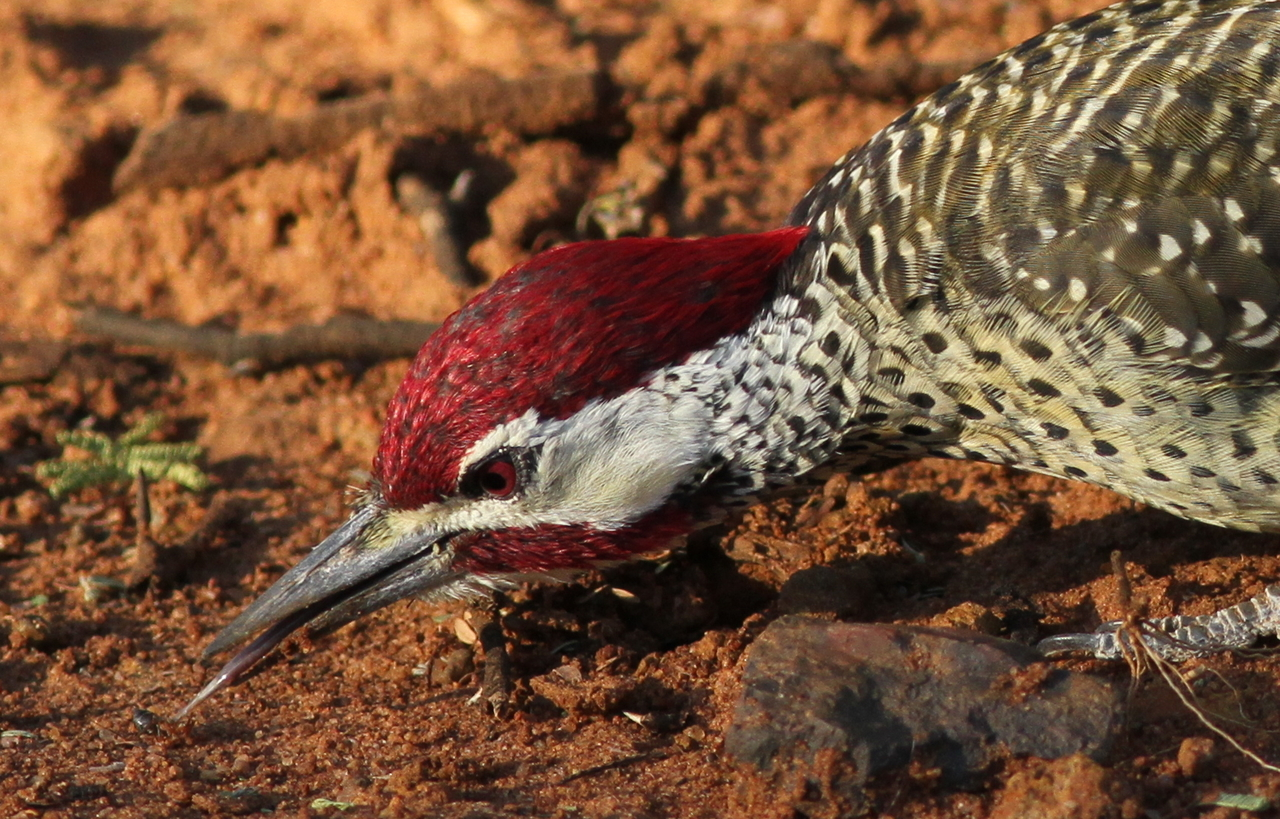
Male foraging on ants
