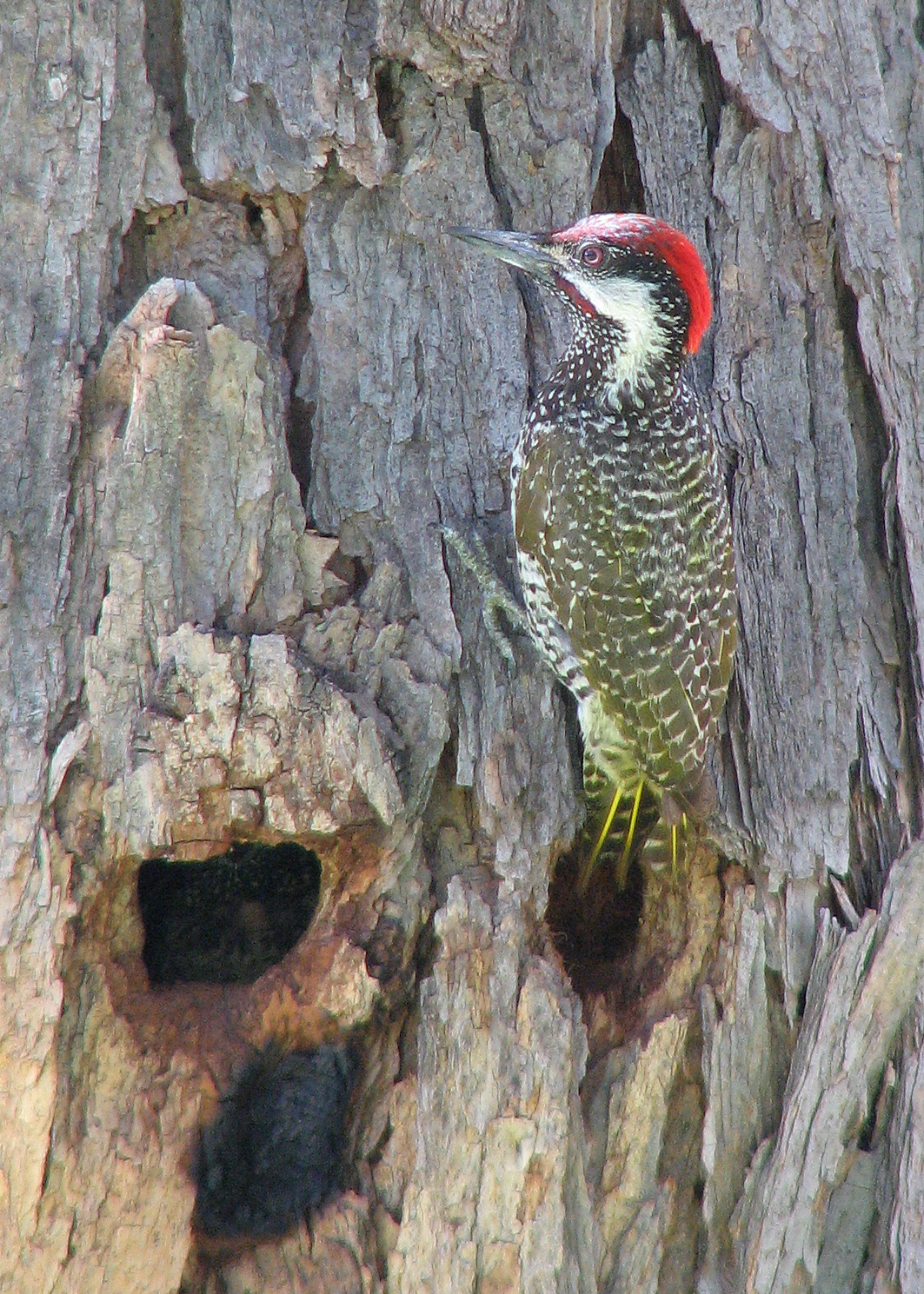
- A male golden-tailed woodpecker (C. abingoni) in northern Namibia

Scientific classification
- Kingdom: Animalia
- Phylum: Chordata
- Class: Aves
- Order: Piciformes
- Family: Picidae
- Tribe: Picini
- Genus: Campethera; G.R. Gray, 1841

Type species
- Dendromus brachyrhynchus Gray, 1841

Species
- see text

= Campethera =

Genus of birds

Campethera is a genus of bird in the family Picidae, or woodpeckers, that are native to sub-Saharan Africa. Most species are native to woodland and savanna rather than deep forest, and multiple species exhibit either arboreal or terrestrial foraging strategies. Its nearest relative is the monotypic genus Geocolaptes of southern Africa, which employs terrestrial foraging and breeding strategies. They are however not close relatives of similar-looking woodpeckers in the "Dendropicos clade".

== Taxonomy ==
The genus Campethera was introduced by the English zoologist George Robert Gray in 1841 with the little green woodpecker (Campethera maculosa) as the type species. The generic name combines the Ancient Greek kampē meaning "caterpillar" and -thēras meaning "hunter".

Species diversity in the "Campethera clade" is believed to be understated, and up to 18 species may be involved. The following 10 species are currently recognized:

Image	Common name	Scientific name	Distribution
	Fine-spotted woodpecker	Campethera punctuligera	Sudan (region) and adjacent areas
	Bennett's woodpecker	Campethera bennettii	miombo and adjacent areas
	Speckle-throated woodpecker	Campethera scriptoricauda	Mozambique, Malawi, and Tanzania
	Nubian woodpecker	Campethera nubica	from Chad in west to Somalia in east and Tanzania in south
	Golden-tailed woodpecker	Campethera abingoni	Angola, Benin, Botswana, Cameroon, Central African Republic, Chad, Republic of the Congo, Democratic Republic of the Congo, Ivory Coast, Eswatini, Gambia, Ghana, Guinea, Guinea-Bissau, Kenya, Malawi, Mali, Mauritania, Mozambique, Namibia, Rwanda, Senegal, South Africa, South Sudan, Tanzania, Uganda, Zambia, and Zimbabwe
	Mombasa woodpecker	Campethera mombassica	Kenya, Somalia, and Tanzania
	Knysna woodpecker	Campethera notata	South Africa
	Little green woodpecker	Campethera maculosa	widely distributed in Sub-Saharan Africa
	Tullberg's woodpecker	Campethera tullbergi	Western High Plateau and Bioko
	Fine-banded woodpecker	Campethera taeniolaema	eastern Congo to Kenya and Tanzania

== Description ==
They are small to medium-sized woodpeckers. The sexes are fairly similar, but males of most species have the crown and nape bright red, while in females this is restricted to the nape. Colour of the malar plumage is also useful in sexing.

Their plumage pattern is fairly uniform, and some species are only distinguishable by careful observation. The mantle, back and wings are olive-greenish, and usually spotted or barred in buffy to golden yellow. The shafts of the remiges and rectrices are yellow to golden yellow. The underpart plumage is spotted black to a lesser or greater degree.

Some species include drumming on dead wood as a means of non-vocal signaling. Most species are poor drummers however, and some species may not drum at all.

== Foraging ==
Their rectrices are only partially stiffened (for arboreal support), and they readily take to terrestrial foraging. Ants and termites form important components of their diet. These are lapped up with a flexible and sticky tongue.

== Gallery ==
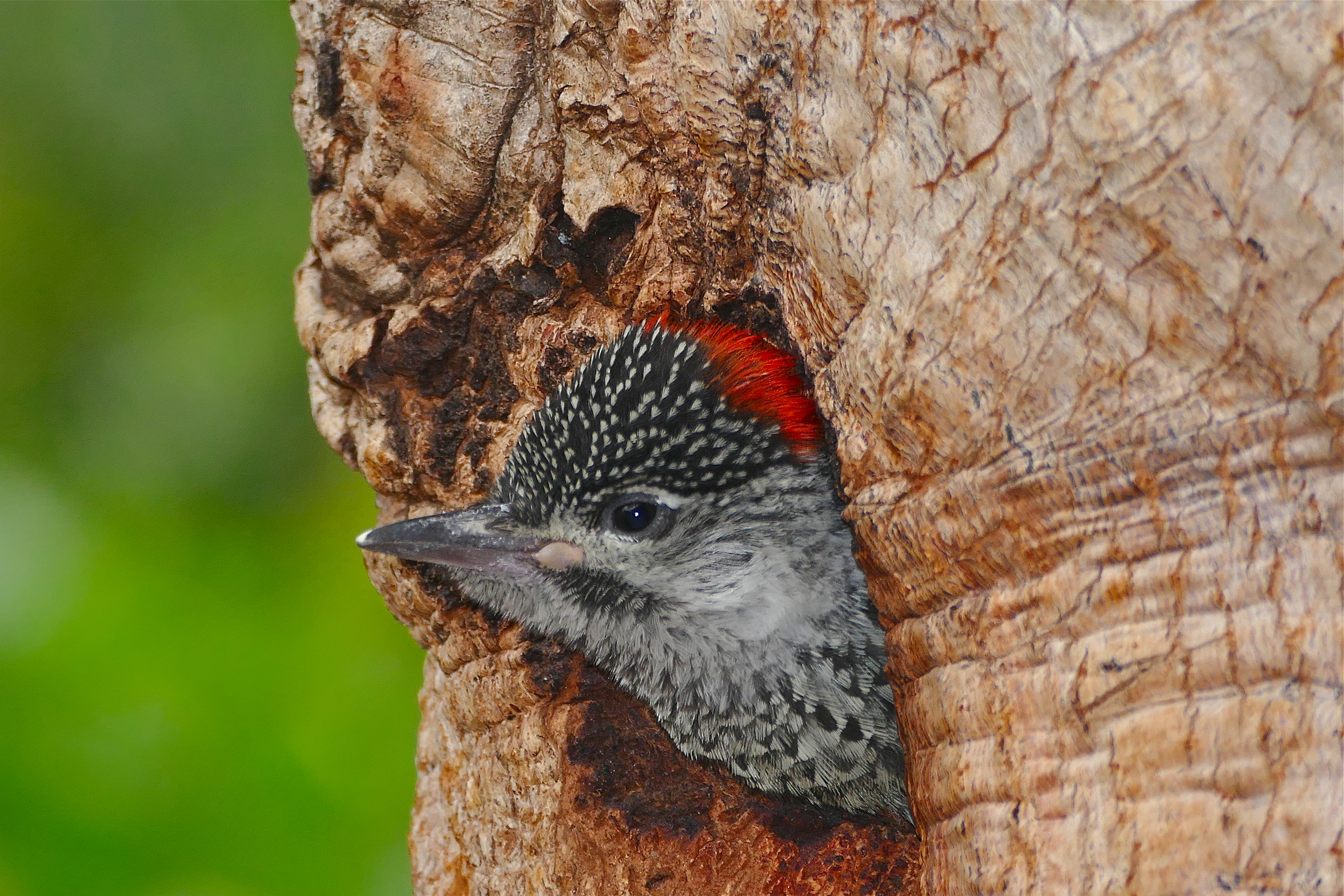
C. abingoni juvenile peeking from nest

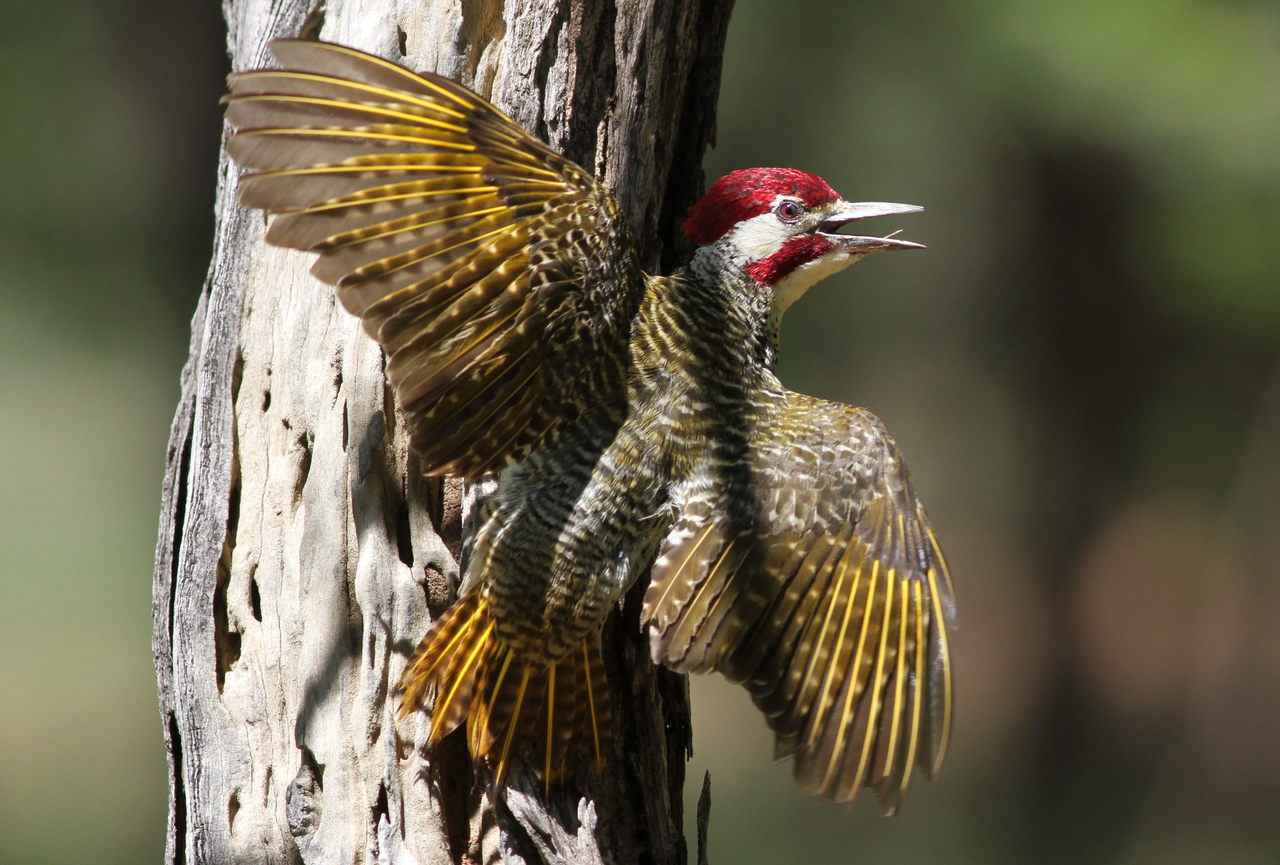
Yellow remige and rectrice shafts in C. bennettii (male)

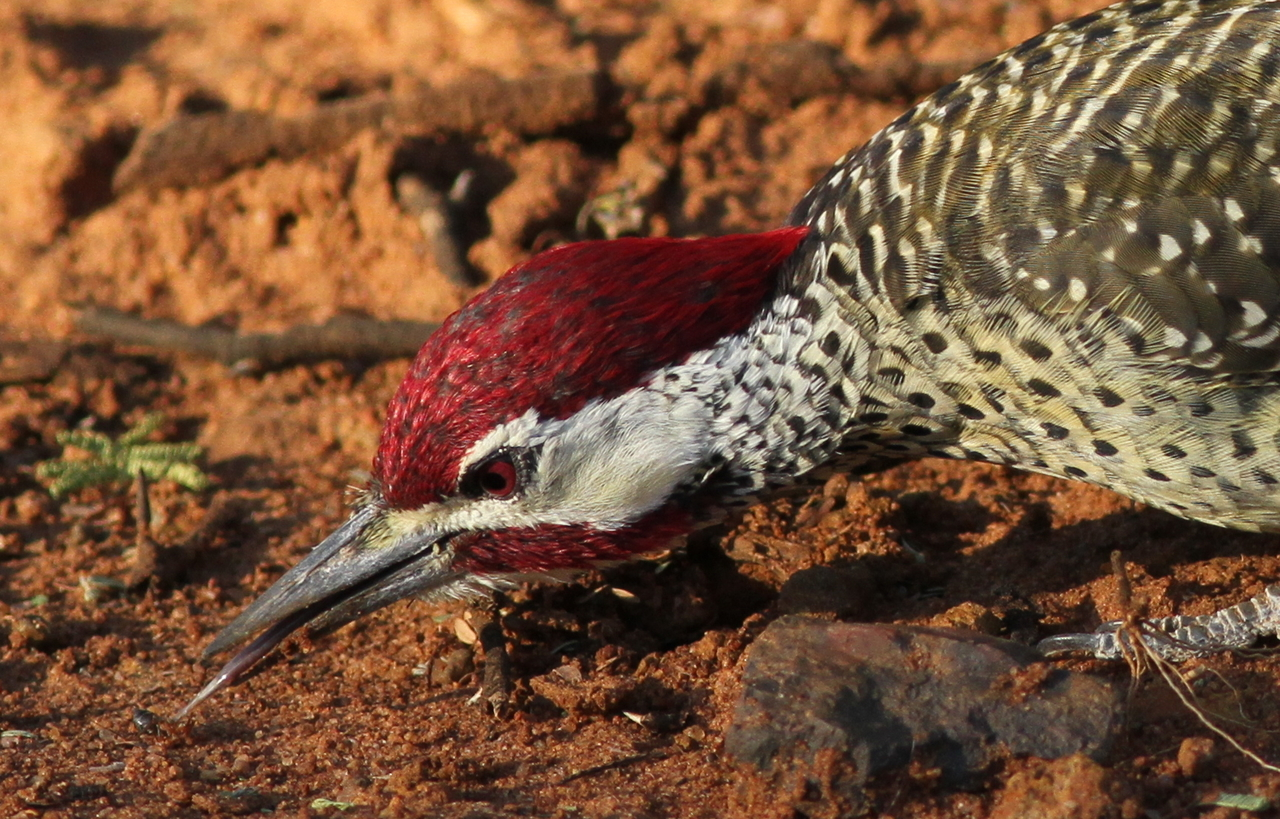
Terrestrial foraging in C. bennettii (male)

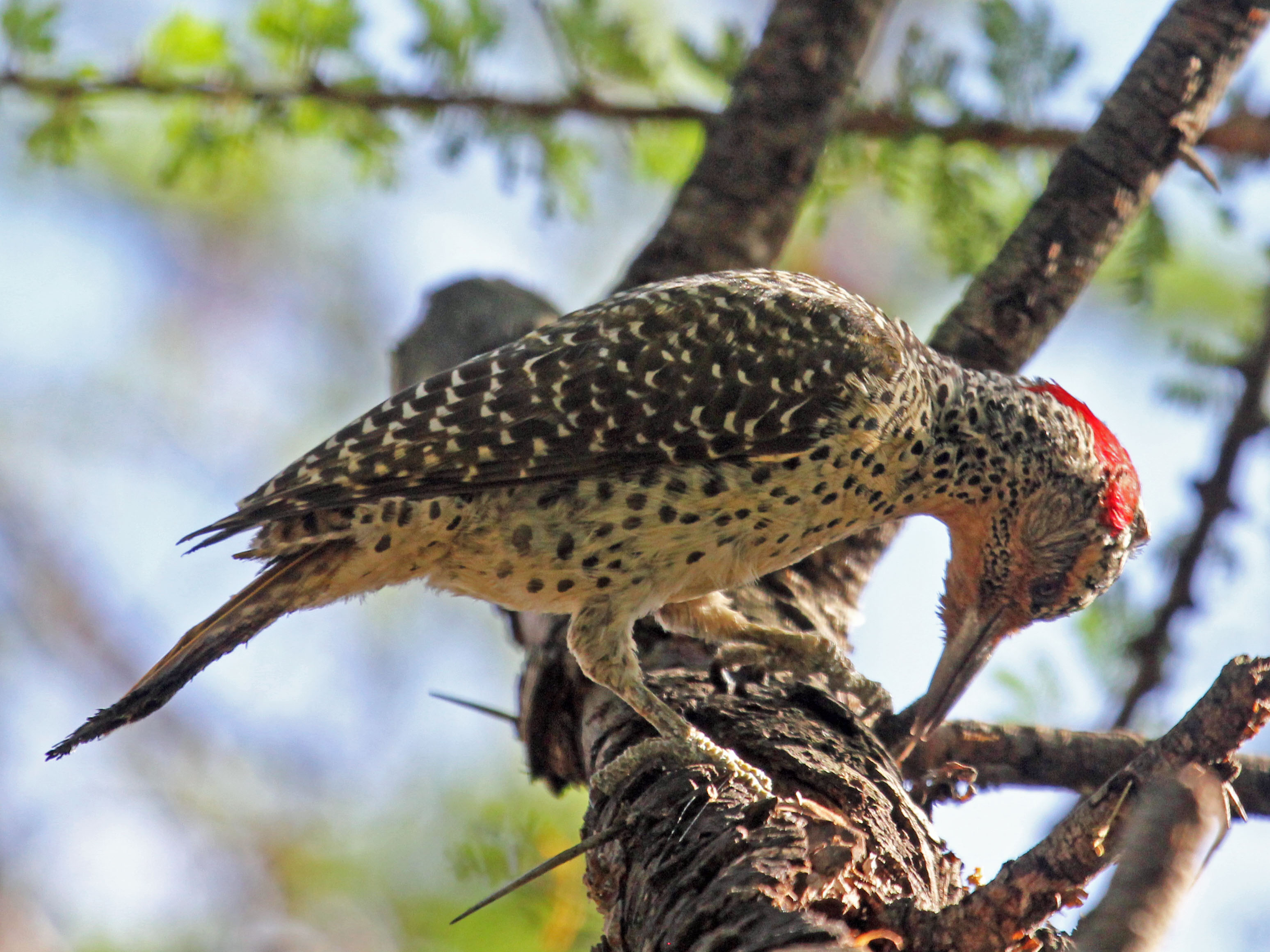
Arboreal foraging in C. nubica (female)
