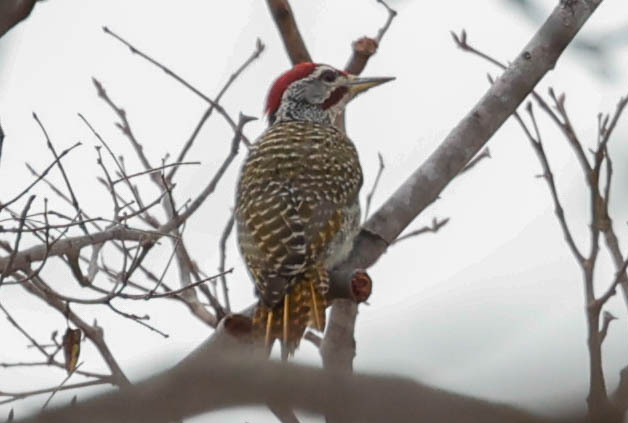

Conservation status
- Least Concern (IUCN 3.1)

Scientific classification
- Kingdom: Animalia
- Phylum: Chordata
- Class: Aves
- Order: Piciformes
- Family: Picidae
- Genus: Campethera
- Species: C. scriptoricauda

Binomial name
- Campethera scriptoricauda (Reichenow, 1896)

= Speckle-throated woodpecker =

Species of bird

The speckle-throated woodpecker (Campethera scriptoricauda), also known as Reichenow's woodpecker, is an East African woodpecker often considered a subspecies of Bennett's woodpecker. The bird is named after the German ornithologist Anton Reichenow.

== Description ==
It is greenish above with yellowish barring (giving a slightly yellower appearance than the similar Nubian woodpecker) and pale yellowish below with black speckles. The speckles continue forward through the throat, the main point of distinction from both the Nubian and Bennett's woodpeckers. The bill is pale, depicted as yellow or off-white.

Among its calls in Tanzania are "wi-wi-wi-wi-wi and a short churr." At least in Mozambique, it is probably vocally indistinguishable from Bennett's woodpecker.

== Distribution and habitat ==
It lives in open woodland in Mozambique between Beira and the lower Zambezi river, in central and southeastern Malawi, and in eastern and central Tanzania north to Handeni as well as in the North Pare Mountains and around Mount Kilimanjaro. Formerly it was also found around Mombasa, Kenya. It inhabits open woodlands. At least in Mozambique, it prefers broad-leaved woodland with an understory of tall grass, and it is probably rather common.

== Taxonomy ==
This bird has been considered a subspecies of the Nubian woodpecker. On the other hand, some authorities lump it with Bennett's woodpecker, Zimmerman et al. because "it is said to intergrade freely with nominate bennettii in Malawi" Here it is considered a separate species following the Handbook of the Birds of the World and other authorities.
