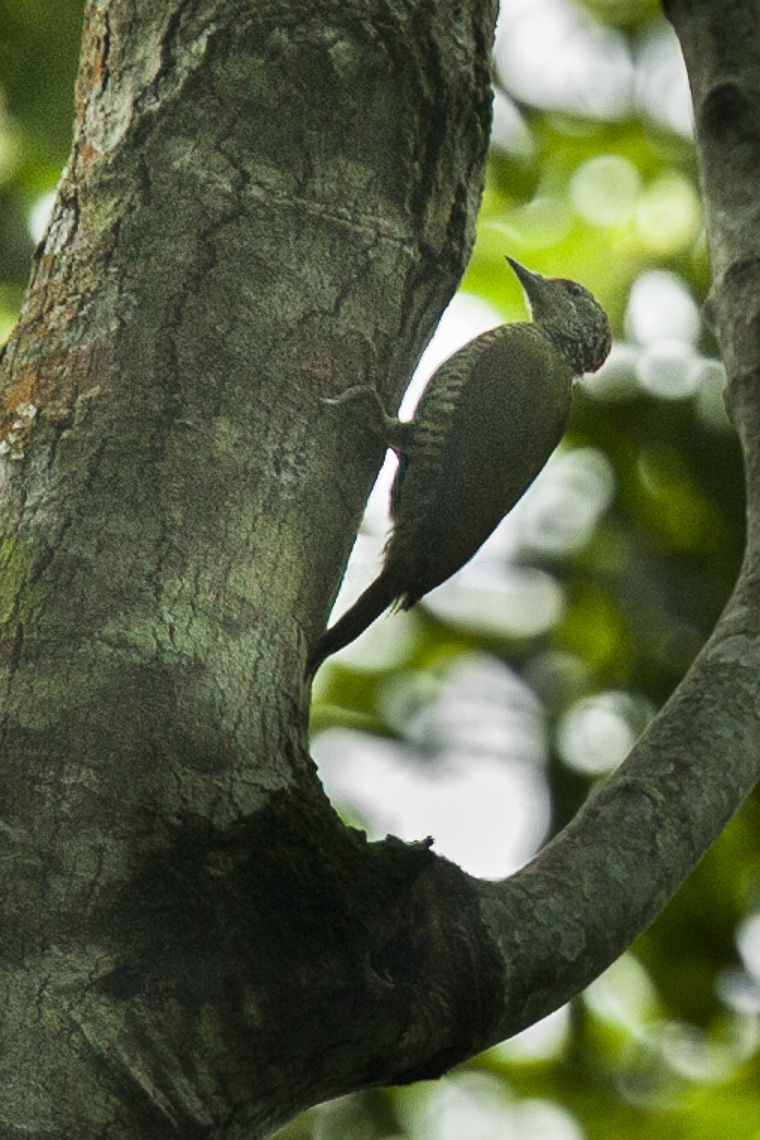

Conservation status
- Least Concern (IUCN 3.1)

Scientific classification
- Kingdom: Animalia
- Phylum: Chordata
- Class: Aves
- Order: Piciformes
- Family: Picidae
- Genus: Campethera
- Species: C. taeniolaema

Binomial name
- Campethera taeniolaema Reichenow & Neumann, 1895

= Fine-banded woodpecker =

Species of bird

The fine-banded woodpecker (Campethera taeniolaema) is a species of bird in the family Picidae.

two subspecies are recognised :

- taeniolaema : Albertine Rift montane forests
- hausburgi : East African montane forests yellow underparts
