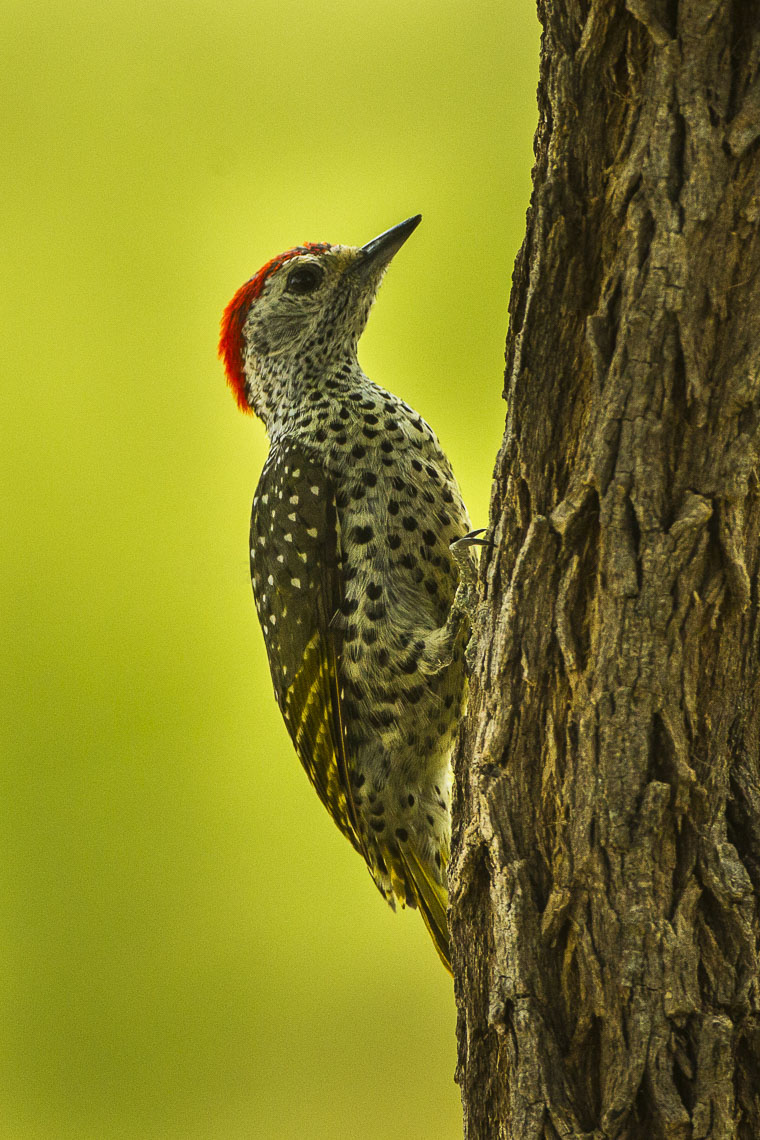

Conservation status
- Least Concern (IUCN 3.1)

Scientific classification
- Kingdom: Animalia
- Phylum: Chordata
- Class: Aves
- Order: Piciformes
- Family: Picidae
- Genus: Campethera
- Species: C. maculosa

Binomial name
- Campethera maculosa (Valenciennes, 1826)

= Little green woodpecker =

Species of bird

The little green woodpecker, or green-backed woodpecker (Campethera maculosa) is a species of bird in the family Picidae. It is widely distributed in tropical Africa, living in forest edges, clearings, and forest-shrub mosaics. The International Union for Conservation of Nature (IUCN) has assessed it as a least-concern species.

== Taxonomy ==
The little green woodpecker was formally described in 1826 as Picus maculosa from Senegal by the French zoologist Achille Valenciennes. The specific epithet is Latin meaning "spotted". The little green woodpecker is now one of ten species placed in the genus Campethera that was introduced in 1841 by the English zoologist George Robert Gray.

Five subspecies are recognised:

- C. m. permista (Reichenow, A, 1876) – eastern Ghana eastward to far southwestern South Sudan and southwestern Uganda, southward to northern Angola, and southern Democratic Republic of the Congo
- C. m. nyansae (Neumann, OR, 1900) – southwestern Ethiopia to southwestern Kenya, northwestern Tanzania, eastern Democratic Republic of the Congo, and northeastern Angola
- C. m. cailliautii (Malherbe, A, 1849) – coastal southern Somalia through Kenya to northeastern Tanzania; Zanzibar
- C. m. loveridgei Hartert, EJO, 1920 – central Tanzania to far eastern Zimbabwe and Mozambique
- C. m. maculosa (Valenciennes, A, 1826) – Senegal and Guinea-Bissau to central Ghana and Liberia

The little green woodpecker was formerly treated as two species: the little green woodpecker (Campethera maculosa) with either two subspecies or as monotypic, and the green-backed woodpecker or little spotted woodpecker (Campethera cailliautii) with three or four subspecies. The two species were merged in 2025 by AviList based on the modest genetic differences and the similar vocalization.

The little green and green-backed woodpeckers have hybridised in Ghana.

== Description ==
The little green woodpecker is about 16 cm (6.3 in) long and weighs about 54 g (1.9 oz). The male's crown is olive-blackish with an indistinct reddish colour, and the nape is red. The head, neck and throat are buff, with brown spots. The upperparts are yellowish-green or bronze-green. The flight feathers are brown and have buffish bars. The tail is blackish, with some yellow and green. The underparts are buffish from the throat to the breast and greenish-white below the breast, all of the underparts having deep olive bars. The beak is olive or blackish, the eye is brown, and the legs are olive-grey. The female does not have red on the head and has buff spots on its crown and nape. The juvenile bird has greener upperparts with pale streaks, and its underparts are paler.

== Distribution and habitat ==
The little green woodpecker is widely distributed across tropical Africa. Its habitat is edges of primary and secondary forests, clearings, and mosaics of forest and shrub, at elevations up to 1,000 m (3,300 ft).

== Behaviour ==
This woodpecker eats arboreal ants. Its calls are a plaintive huweeeeh, a harsh whee, kewik, three to four teeay notes, and teerweet. It excavates nests in nests of ants and termites. It breeds in August and possibly in March and April.

== Conservation status ==
Logging and clearing of forests appears to be causing a population increase because the bird prefers open habitats. The species has a large range and increasing population, so the IUCN has assessed it as a least-concern species.
