= Tycho Tullberg =

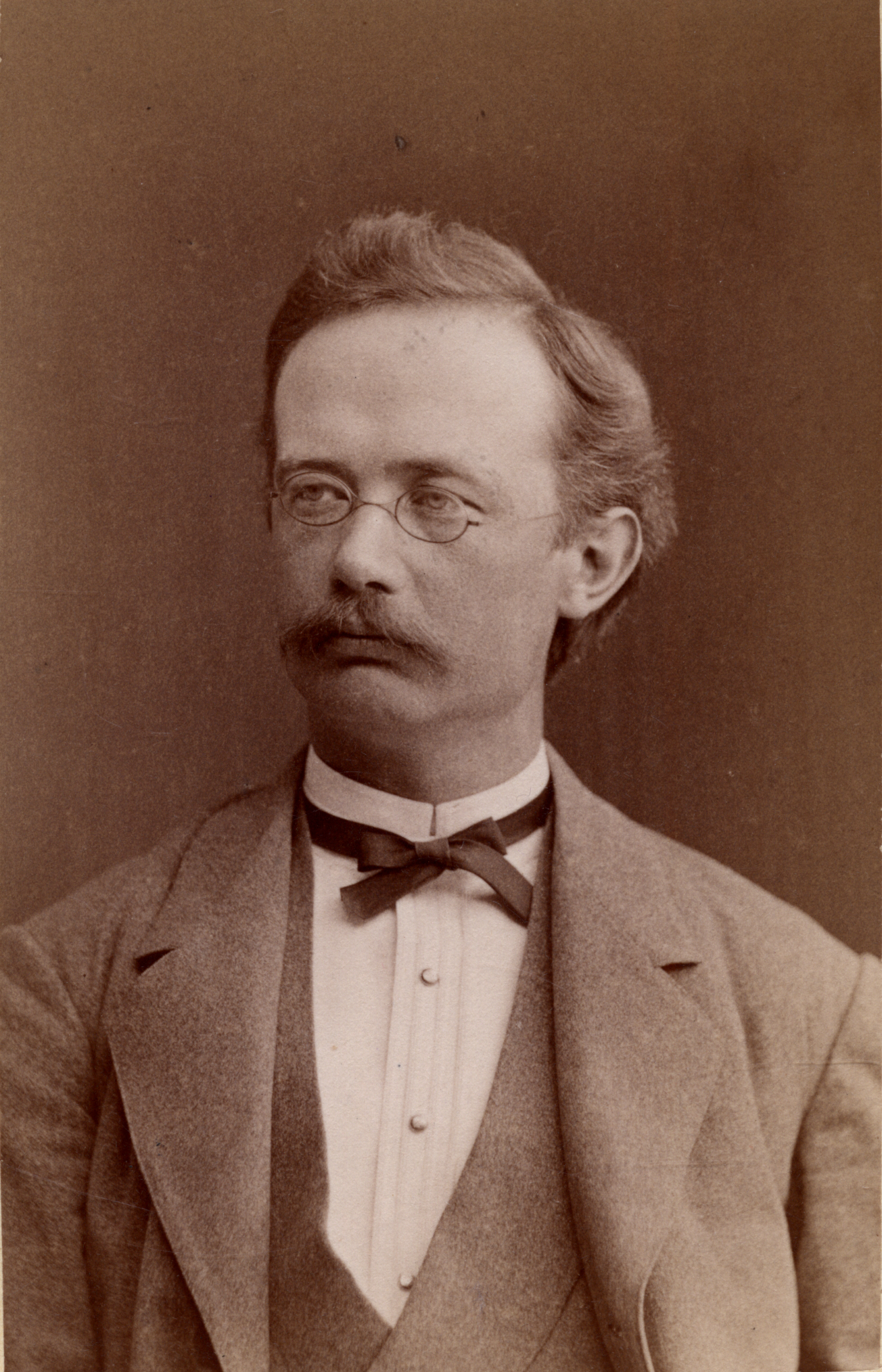
Tullberg c. 1885

Tycho Fredrik Hugo Tullberg (9 October 1842 – 24 April 1920) was a Swedish zoologist, artist and sculptor. He was a great-grandson of Carl Linnaeus and conducted studies on a wide range of animals including springtails, rodents, molluscs and whales. Access to Norwegian whaling stations allowed him to examine the development of the baleen of blue whales in specimens that were killed. The woodpecker Campethera tullbergi is named after him.

== Life and work ==
Tullberg was born in Uppsala where his father Otto Frederik Tullberg was a musician and Hebraist. His mother Sofia Lovisa Christina Ridderbjelke was the granddaughter of Carl Linnaeus. After schooling at the cathedral school he went to the University of Uppsala in 1863. He also worked as a drawing teacher at the Folkskollärarseminariet. He received a doctorate in 1869 for his studies on the Scandinavian Collembola, particularly the genus Podura. He became an associate professor of zoology in 1871. In 1875 he described the mollusc Neomenia carinata. In 1877 he studied the foot of the mollusc Mytilus edulis for which he received the Flormanska prize. Tullberg suggested that the Proboscoidea evolved in Africa. He worked in collaboration with the Vadsø whaling station where he was able to examine the anatomy of whales that had been brought in by whalers. His study of the growth of the baleen in blue whales has been considered as unique. He also studied the evolution of rodents. He became a professor in 1882 and retired in 1907.

As a descendant of Linnaeus he took a great deal of interest in Linnaeus and produced a collection of all the portraits of him in 1907. He was also involved in establishing the Swedish Linnean Society in 1917 serving as its chairperson until his death.

Tullberg produced numerous animal and landscape paintings and wood carvings of animals. In 1860 he received an award for a lion carved in wood. A bust of Linnaeus that he made was exhibited in 1916. His drawings and etchings are preserved at Uppsala University.

Tullberg married Fanny Hägglöf in 1878. He is buried in Uppsala Old Cemetery.
