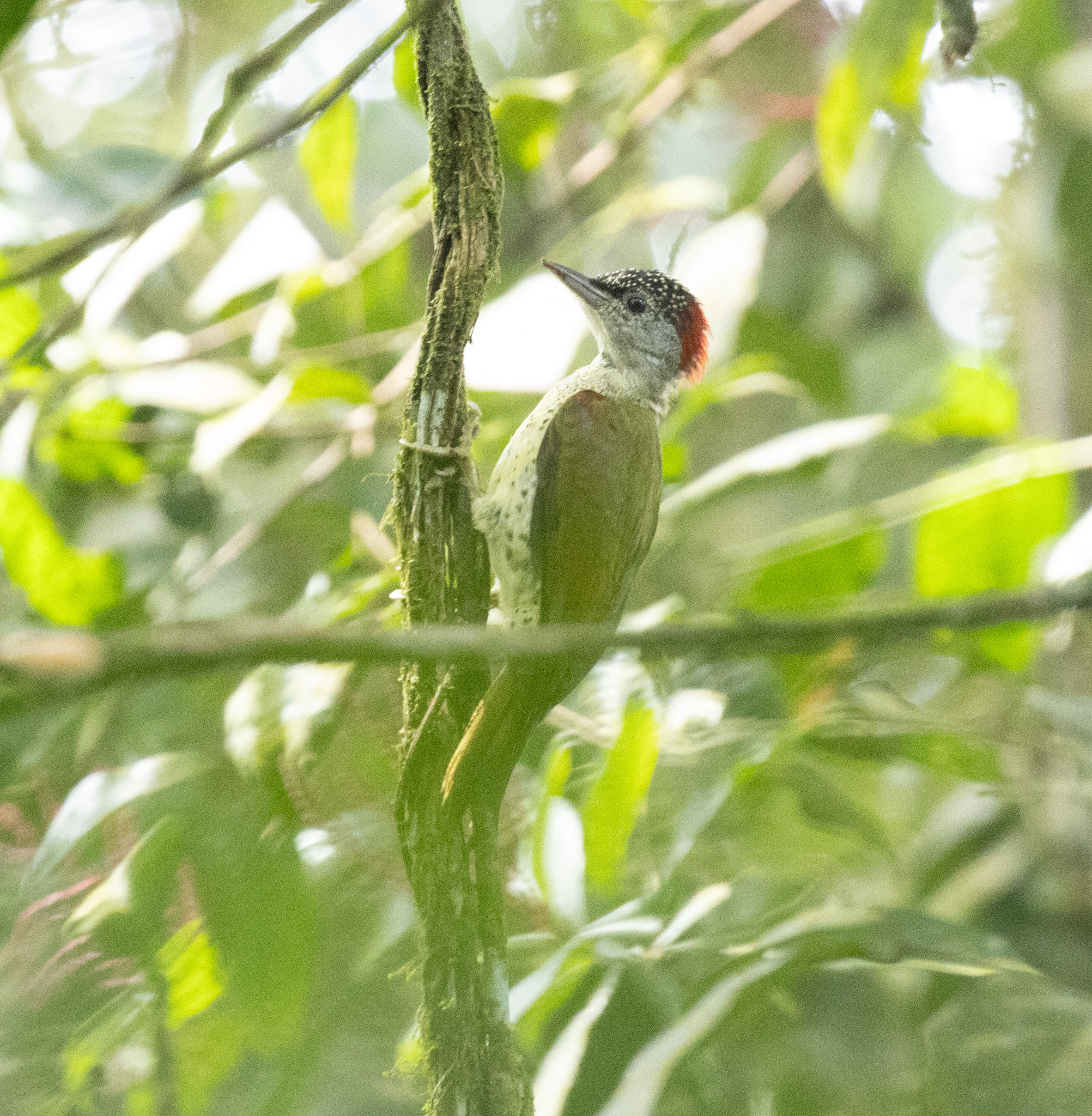

Conservation status
- Least Concern (IUCN 3.1)

Scientific classification
- Kingdom: Animalia
- Phylum: Chordata
- Class: Aves
- Order: Piciformes
- Family: Picidae
- Genus: Campethera
- Species: C. tullbergi

Binomial name
- Campethera tullbergi Sjöstedt, 1892

= Tullberg's woodpecker =

Species of bird

Tullberg's woodpecker (Campethera tullbergi) is a species of bird in the family Picidae. It is found in western Cameroon, adjacent Nigeria, and Bioko island.

The common name and Latin binomial commemorates the Swedish zoologist Tycho Fredrik Hugo Tullberg (1842-1920).
