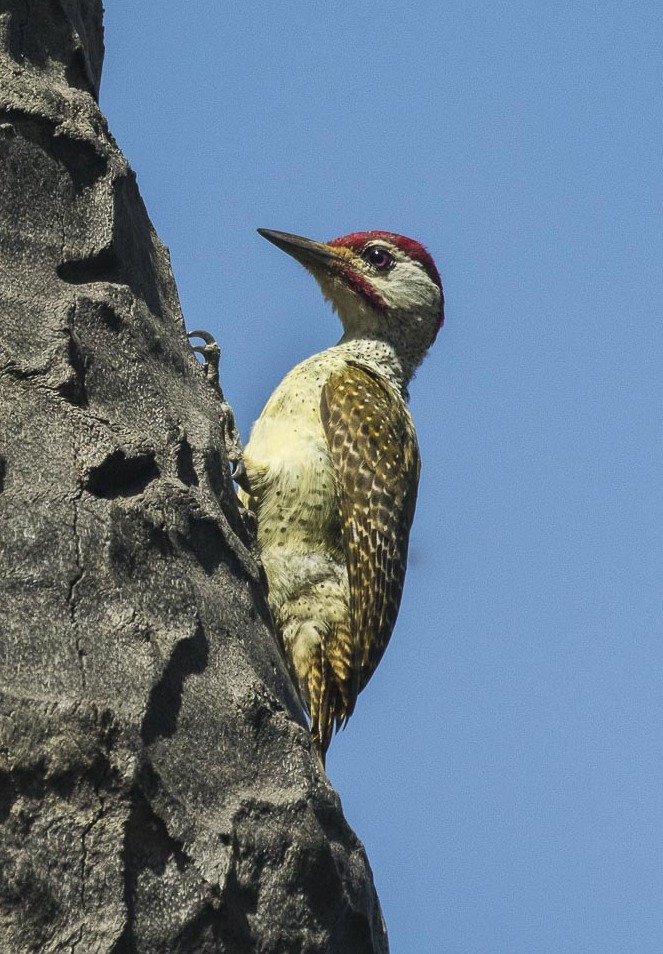

Conservation status
- Least Concern (IUCN 3.1)

Scientific classification
- Kingdom: Animalia
- Phylum: Chordata
- Class: Aves
- Order: Piciformes
- Family: Picidae
- Genus: Campethera
- Species: C. punctuligera

Binomial name
- Campethera punctuligera (Wagler, 1827)

= Fine-spotted woodpecker =

Species of bird

The fine-spotted woodpecker (Campethera punctuligera) is a member of the woodpecker family Picidae. It is a widespread and frequently common resident breeder in much of west and central tropical Africa. It is a species associated with open forest, savannah and bush. This bird has a wide range and is a common species, and the International Union for Conservation of Nature has rated its conservation status as being of "least concern".

== Description ==
This bird is 22 cm (8.7 in) in length. It is a typical woodpecker shape, and has green upper parts marked with fine pale spots, except on the rump and tail, which have pale bars instead. The underparts are whitish or yellowish with fine dark spots on breast, belly and flanks. The head is whitish with greyer cheeks and chin, again with tiny dark spots.

The adult male fine-spotted woodpecker has a red crown and moustachial stripes. Females have a dark forecrown, with red on the rear half. They lack the red moustaches. Young birds are like the female, but the green of the plumage is darker. Like other woodpeckers, this species has a straight pointed bill, a stiff tail to provide support against tree trunks, and zygodactyl or "yoked" feet, with two toes pointing forward, and two backward. The long tongue can be darted forward to capture insects. The call of this vocal species is a loud kip-kip-kip-kiech-kiech-kiech.

== Distribution and habitat ==
The fine-spotted woodpecker is native to the Sudan (region) and adjacent areas. Its habitat is typically wooded savannah, scrub and grassland with scattered Acacia and other trees.

== Ecology ==
Like other woodpeckers, this species is insectivorous. It is a specialist termite feeder, and is frequently seen near termite mounds and picking insects off trees and the ground. It often forages in small family groups and may join mixed flocks of birds. The nest is built in a tree hole, often in an oil palm, and the clutch consists of two or three white eggs.
