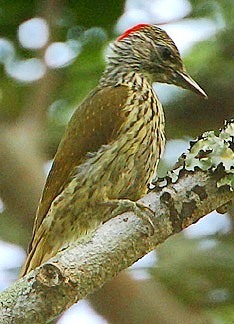

Conservation status
- Least Concern (IUCN 3.1)

Scientific classification
- Kingdom: Animalia
- Phylum: Chordata
- Class: Aves
- Order: Piciformes
- Family: Picidae
- Genus: Campethera
- Species: C. mombassica

Binomial name
- Campethera mombassica (Fischer & Reichenow, 1884)

= Mombasa woodpecker =

Species of bird

The Mombasa woodpecker (Campethera mombassica) is a species of bird in the family Picidae. It is found in Kenya, Somalia, and Tanzania.
