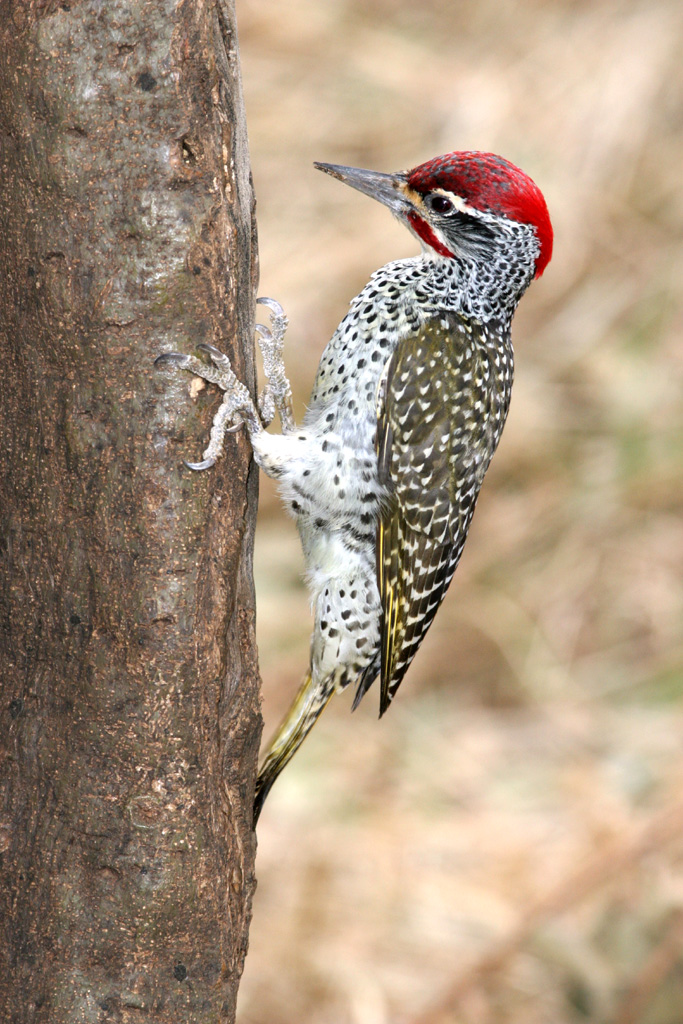
- Male, Samburu National Reserve, Kenya
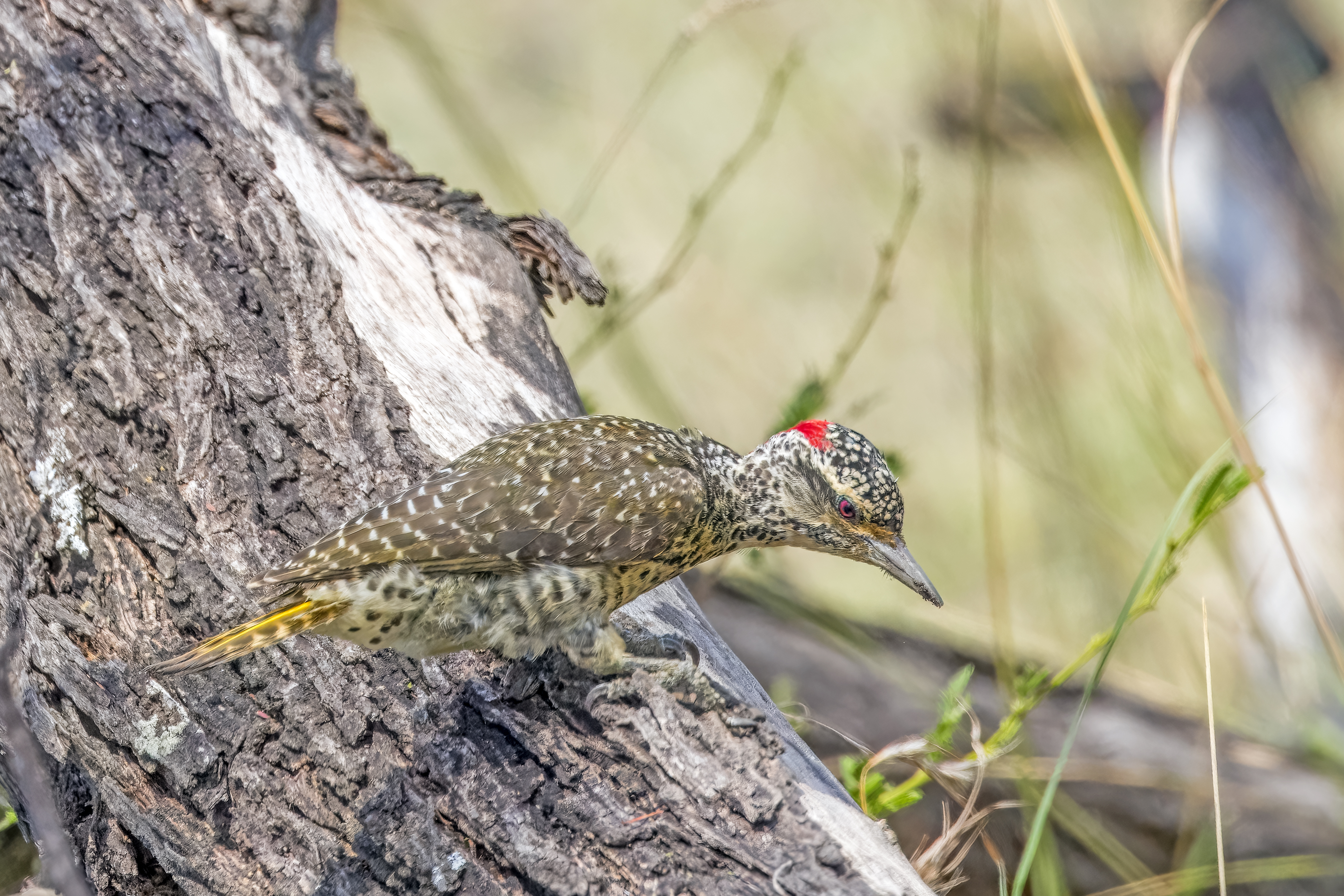
- Female, Serengeti National Park, Tanzania

Conservation status
- Least Concern (IUCN 3.1)

Scientific classification
- Kingdom: Animalia
- Phylum: Chordata
- Class: Aves
- Order: Piciformes
- Family: Picidae
- Genus: Campethera
- Species: C. nubica

Binomial name
- Campethera nubica (Boddaert, 1783)

= Nubian woodpecker =

Species of bird

The Nubian woodpecker (Campethera nubica) is a species of bird in the family Picidae. It is distributed widely in Central and Eastern Africa, from Chad in west to Somalia in east and Tanzania in south. It is a fairly common species with a wide range, the population seems stable, and the International Union for Conservation of Nature has rated its conservation status as being of "least concern".

== Taxonomy ==
The Nubian woodpecker was described by the French polymath Georges-Louis Leclerc, Comte de Buffon in 1780 in his Histoire Naturelle des Oiseaux from a specimen collected in Nubia. The bird was also illustrated in a hand-coloured plate engraved by François-Nicolas Martinet in the Planches Enluminées D'Histoire Naturelle which was produced under the supervision of Edme-Louis Daubenton to accompany Buffon's text. Neither the plate caption nor Buffon's description included a scientific name but in 1783 the Dutch naturalist Pieter Boddaert coined the binomial name Picus nubicus in his catalogue of the Planches Enluminées. The Nubian woodpecker is now placed in the genus Campethera that was introduced by the English zoologist George Robert Gray in 1841. The generic name combines the Ancient Greek kampē meaning "caterpillar" and -thēras meaning "hunter".

Two subspecies are recognised:

- Campethera nubica nubica (Boddaert, 1783) – Sudan and Ethiopia to northeast Democratic Republic of the Congo, southwest Tanzania and Kenya
- Campethera nubica pallida (Sharpe, 1902) – south Somalia and coastal Kenya

== Description ==
The Nubian woodpecker Is a medium-sized species growing to a length of about 21 cm (8.3 in). The male has a red crown and nape and a reddish streak on the cheek, while the female has a black crown speckled with white, a red nape, and a dark cheek stripe with white speckling. In other respects, the sexes are similar. The upper parts are olive-brown with much cream speckling and barring. The wings are greenish-brown barred with white and the tail greenish-yellow barred with brown, the shafts of the feathers being gold. The throat is cream and the head, neck, breast and belly are white, spotted and barred with black. The beak is grey with a dark tip, the eye red or pink, the orbital ring grey and the feet olive or grey. Various vocalisations are made, shrill ringing or piping notes repeated, often musical but sometimes metallic. Often sung in duet.

== Distribution and habitat ==
The Nubian woodpecker is endemic to eastern Africa. Its range includes Chad, Democratic Republic of the Congo, Djibouti, Eritrea, Ethiopia, Kenya, Somalia, South Sudan, Sudan, Tanzania and Uganda. Its typical habitat is open savannah woodland, especially with Acacia and Euphorbia, bushy areas and scrub. It is a non-migratory bird, and is found at altitudes up to 2,000 m (6,600 ft).

== Behaviour and ecology ==
The Nubian woodpecker often feeds alone, keeping in touch with its mate vocally. It forages mostly in trees, but also on the ground, for ants and termites, also consuming spiders and beetles.
