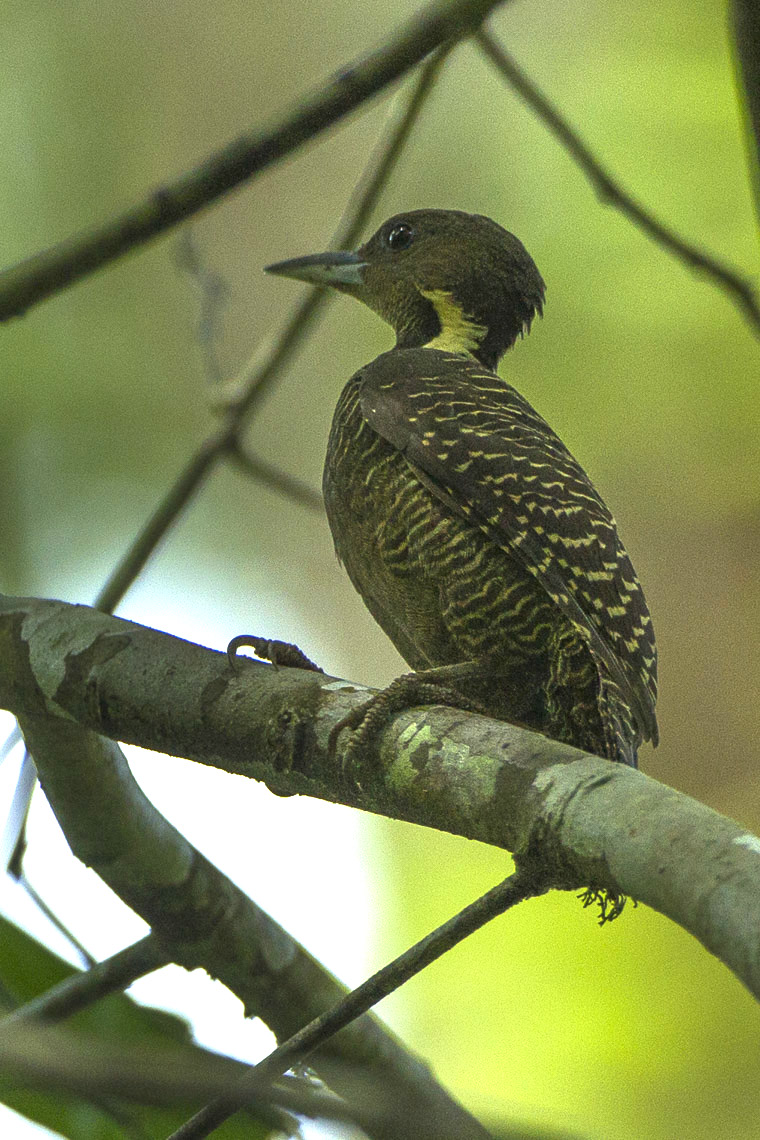

Conservation status
- Near Threatened (IUCN 3.1)

Scientific classification
- Kingdom: Animalia
- Phylum: Chordata
- Class: Aves
- Order: Piciformes
- Family: Picidae
- Genus: Meiglyptes
- Species: M. tukki

Binomial name
- Meiglyptes tukki (Lesson, 1839)

= Buff-necked woodpecker =

Species of bird

The buff-necked woodpecker (Meiglyptes tukki) is a species of bird in the family Picidae.

== History and Taxonomy ==
Meiglyptes tukki was first described by the French ornithologist René Primevère Lesson in 1839 as Picus tukki.

It has four subspecies: Meiglyptes tukki tukki, Meiglyptes tukki percnerpes, Meiglyptes tukki batu, and Meiglyptes tukki pulonis.

== Morphology ==
Meiglyptes tukki is small and dark brown with pale wing barring and a dirty-cream stripe on the neck. It has a pointed bill which is curved along the culmen. It is slightly heavier than its close relative Meiglyptes tristis and has a significantly longer tail. M. tukki is distinguished from its closest relatives by the lack of a nuchal crest.

A 1978 survey of fourteen individuals recorded mean body mass of 53g and a mean wing length of 101mm. The mean bill length, width, and depth noted in the 1978 survey were 22.68mm, 8.66mm, and 7.98mm, respectively.

== Distribution ==
M. tukki is found in Brunei, Indonesia, Malaysia, Myanmar, Singapore, and Thailand. It inhabits primary evergreen and semi-evergreen lowland forests and peat swamp forests.

== Behavior ==
M. tukki primarily forages by surface gleaning and probing on branches and sapling trunks. It primarily feeds on ants and termites. A 2004 observational study noted that M. tukki primarily forages in the midstory, occupying a distinct niche from the sympatric M. tristis. It favors small perches and frequently feeding on arboreal ant nests, Pairs often forage within a short distance of one another. Individuals have been observed foraging in interspecies flocks.

Meiglyptes tukki nests in rotted stumps.

== Relationship with humans ==
M. tukki is presumed to be threatened by habitat loss, particularly in the Greater Sundaic bioregion due to timber harvesting and the proliferation of palm-oil and rubber plantations. The resilience of M. tukki to habitat disturbance is unknown. A survey conducted in Malaysia in 2009 observed the species feeding in a palm-oil plantation however other surveys have documented the species' absence in disturbed areas; surveys conducted in North Sumatra (2010-2011) and Indonesia (2017) found that the M. tukki was absent from a sago plantation and a rubber tree plantation respectively, though present in adjacent regions of conserved forest.

In his 1976 work Birds and deities in Borneo, the anthropologist Peter Metcalf noted that one subspecies of the buff-necked woodpecker, M. tukki tukki, was considered an augur animal among some populations of the Kenyah people. In the Long Terawan dialect of Berawan it was known as a sirεk, a name it shared with the grey-capped pygmy woodpecker and the hair-crested drongo. According to one native informant to see a sirεk to one's right was thought to be a good omen, while seeing one on one's left or cutting across one's path was a bad omen indicating that one should turn back. Another informant described the sirεk as having a "bad voice" which foretold thunder or an encounter with a dangerous animal.
