= C. brachyurus =

C. brachyurus may refer to:

- Camaroptera brachyura, the green-backed camaroptera, a bird species
- Carcharhinus brachyurus, the copper shark, a shark species
- Chrysocyon brachyurus, the maned wolf, a canid species

== Synonyms ==
- Celeus brachyurus, a synonym for Micropternus brachyurus, the rufous woodpecker, a bird species
