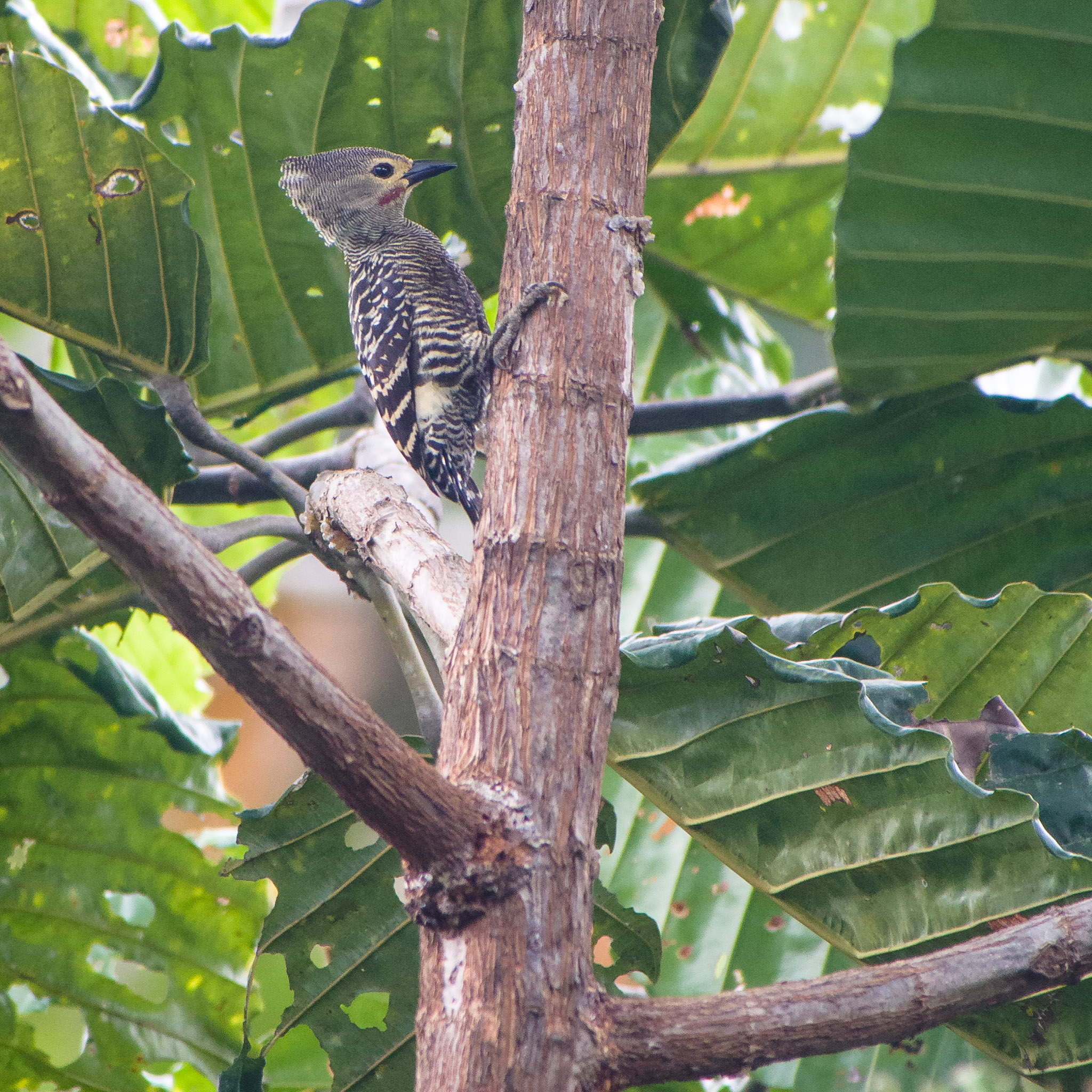
- M. grammithorax

Conservation status
- Least Concern (IUCN 3.1)

Scientific classification
- Kingdom: Animalia
- Phylum: Chordata
- Class: Aves
- Order: Piciformes
- Family: Picidae
- Genus: Meiglyptes
- Species: M. grammithorax

Binomial name
- Meiglyptes grammithorax (Malherbe, 1862)

= Buff-rumped woodpecker =

Species of bird

The buff-rumped woodpecker (Meiglyptes grammithorax) is a species of bird in the family Picidae. It is native to Southeast Asia.

== History and Taxonomy ==
A specimen of M. grammithorax was included in a collection of twenty-one Sumatran bird specimens presented to Lord Edward Smith-Stanley in 1825 by Sir Stamford Raffles, who labelled it as a zebra woodpecker (then called Picus tristis). As of 2020 the original specimen was still held at the National Museums Liverpool.

M. grammithorax was described as a distinct species in 1862 by the French magistrate and amateur naturalist Alfred Malherbe in his four-volume work Monographie des picidées.

== Morphology ==
The buff-rumped woodpecker has a small nuchal crest, black-and-white wings and fine barring on the belly. Males have a red "mustache" stripe. The buff-rumped woodpecker is distinguished by a prominent whitish-buff rump patch (though this is not always visible).

The American ornithologist James Chapin noted that first primary feather in the juvenal (or juvenile) plumage of M. grammithorax was reduced, a feature not seen in the adult plumage. A similar reduction of one or more of the primary features was noted in several other species of woodpeckers.

== Distribution ==
M. grammithorax is found in southern Myanmar, Thailand, Malaya, Sumatra and Borneo where it primarily occupies subtropical or tropical dry forests and subtropical or tropical moist lowland forests. It was previously observed in Singapore but is thought to be locally extirpated due to habitat loss.

== Behavior ==
Buff-rumped woodpeckers often forage in pairs and have been observed joining mixed flocks with other insectivorous birds. They have been observed leaf-gleaning and foraging for ants in the forest canopy.

An observational study of banded woodpeckers conducted in 2025 noted a pair of buff-rumped woodpeckers repurposing and excavating an old nest-hole used by another species.

== Relationship to humans ==
The species is presumed to be threatened by the conversion of native forests in the Sundaic region to palm-oil and rubber plantations.
