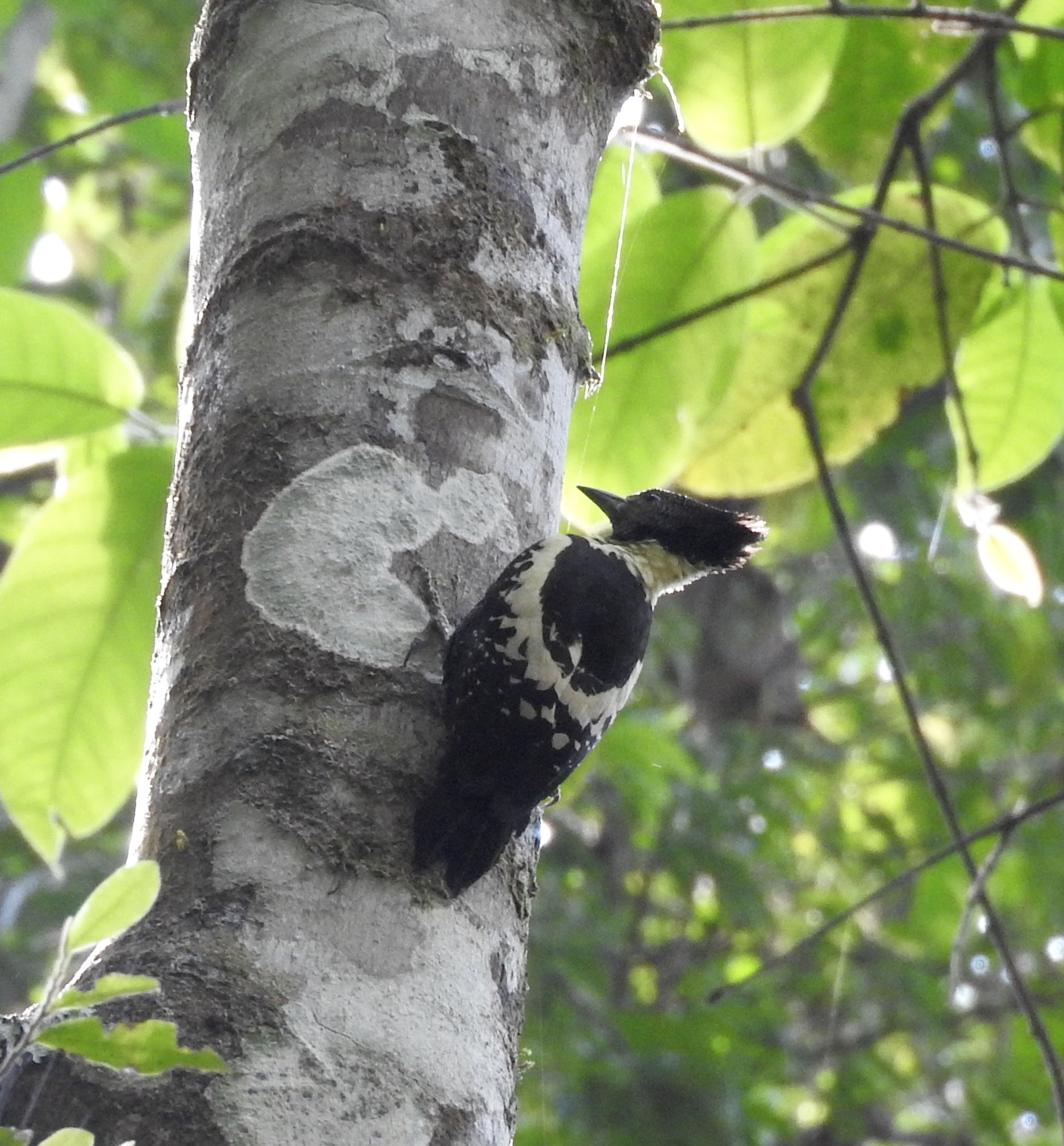

Conservation status
- Least Concern (IUCN 3.1)

Scientific classification
- Kingdom: Animalia
- Phylum: Chordata
- Class: Aves
- Order: Piciformes
- Family: Picidae
- Genus: Meiglyptes
- Species: M. jugularis

Binomial name
- Meiglyptes jugularis (Blyth, 1845)

= Black-and-buff woodpecker =

Species of bird

The black-and-buff woodpecker (Meiglyptes jugularis) is a species of bird in the family Picidae. It is native to Southeast Asia.

== History and Taxonomy ==
Meiglyptes jugularis was described by the zoologist Edward Blyth in 1845. In his Catalogue of Mammals and Birds of Burma, he notes that the species was previously described by Sundevall (likely Carl Jakob Sundevall) in 1842 as a species dubiae. Sundevall includes a description of M. jugularis in his 1866 work Conspectum avium picinarum.

== Morphology ==
Meiglyptes jugularis has a distinct patchy black-and-white pattern and a triangular crest. The base of the bill has a subtle reddish tinge in males; the two sexes are otherwise similar in appearance.

== Distribution and Behavior ==
Meiglyptes jugularis has been observed in Cambodia, Laos, Myanmar, Thailand, and Vietnam. It inhabits lowland forests and prefers open patches and forest edges. It is presumed to be threatened by deforestation in its home range.

Meiglyptes jugularis forages alone or in pairs. It gravitates towards slender branches and leaf clusters when foraging.
