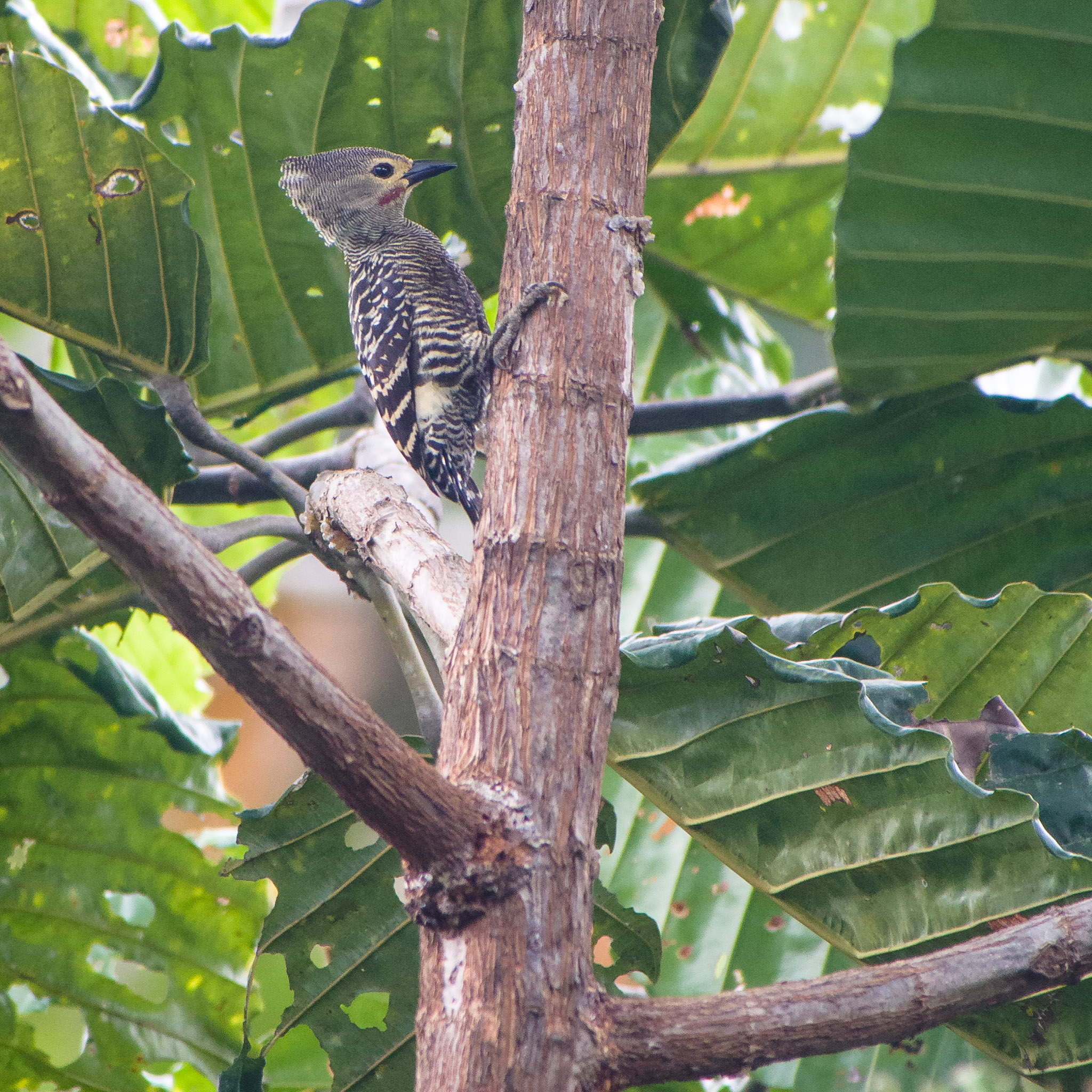
- Buff-rumped woodpecker (Meiglyptes grammithorax)

Scientific classification
- Kingdom: Animalia
- Phylum: Chordata
- Class: Aves
- Order: Piciformes
- Family: Picidae
- Tribe: Picini
- Genus: Meiglyptes; Swainson, 1837

Type species
- Picus poicilophus Temminck, 1823

Species
- see text

= Meiglyptes =

Genus of birds

Meiglyptes is a genus of Southeast Asian birds in the woodpecker family Picidae.

The genus was introduced by the English naturalist William Swainson in 1837 with the white-rumped woodpecker (Meiglyptes tristis) as the type species. The name combines the Ancient Greek meiōn meaning "smaller" or "lesser" with gluptēs meaning "carver." The genus belongs to the tribe Picini within the woodpecker subfamily Picinae. The genus is sister to the rufous woodpecker in its own monotypic genus Micropternus.

The genus contains four species.

Image	Scientific name	Common name	Distribution
	Meiglyptes grammithorax	Buff-rumped woodpecker	southern Myanmar and Thailand, Malaya, Sumatra and Borneo
	Meiglyptes tristis	Zebra woodpecker	Java
	Meiglyptes jugularis	Black-and-buff woodpecker	Cambodia, Laos, Myanmar, Thailand, and Vietnam.
	Meiglyptes tukki	Buff-necked woodpecker	Brunei, Indonesia, Malaysia, Myanmar, Singapore, and Thailand
