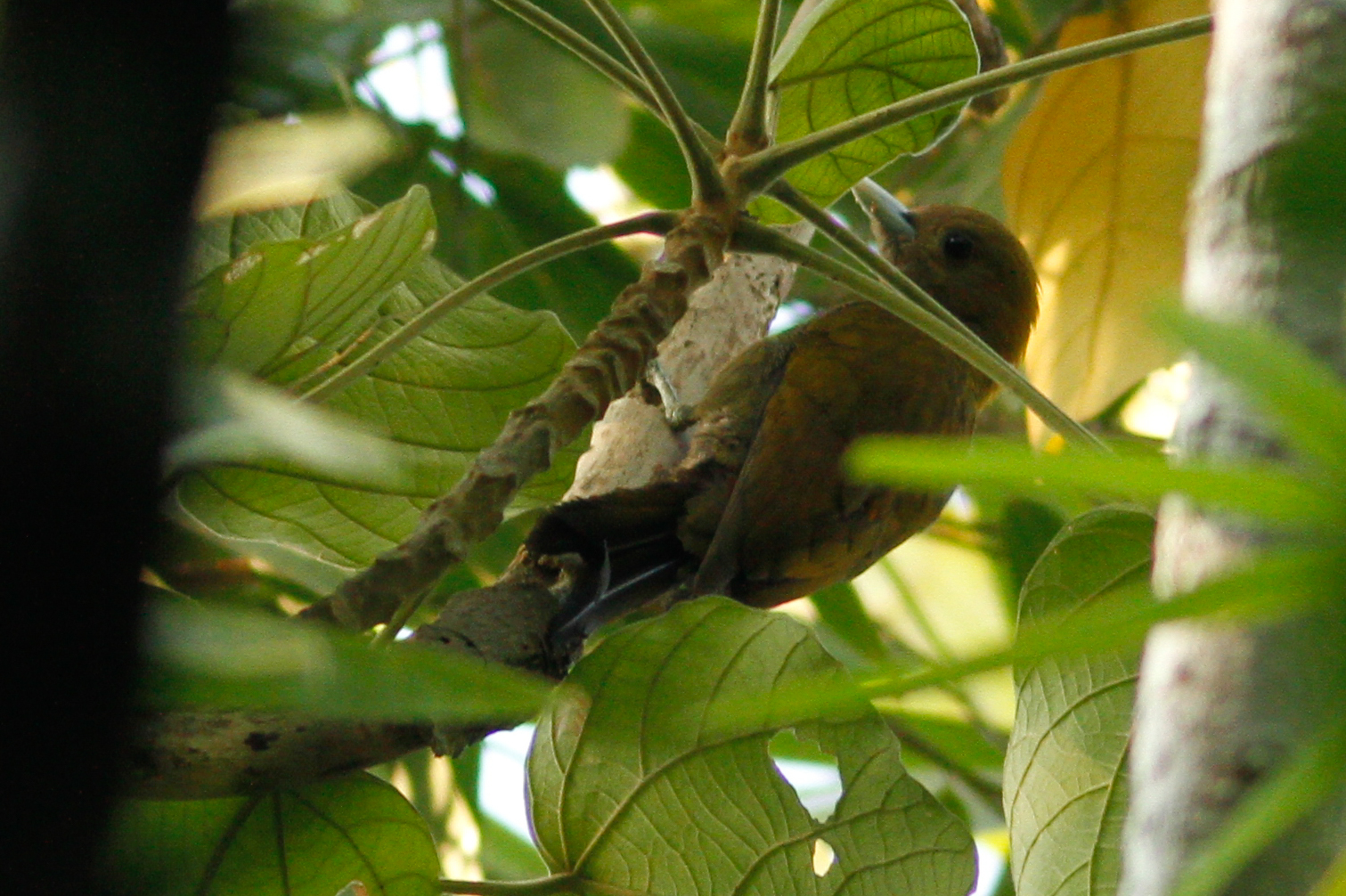
- A female bamboo woodpecker

Conservation status
- Least Concern (IUCN 3.1)

Scientific classification
- Kingdom: Animalia
- Phylum: Chordata
- Class: Aves
- Order: Piciformes
- Family: Picidae
- Genus: Gecinulus
- Species: G. viridis

Binomial name
- Gecinulus viridis Blyth, 1862

= Bamboo woodpecker =

Species of bird

The bamboo woodpecker, or Gecinulus viridis, is a species of bird in the family Picidae. It is found in Myanmar, Laos, Thailand and Malaysia. Its natural habitats are subtropical or tropical dry forests and subtropical or tropical moist lowland forests.
