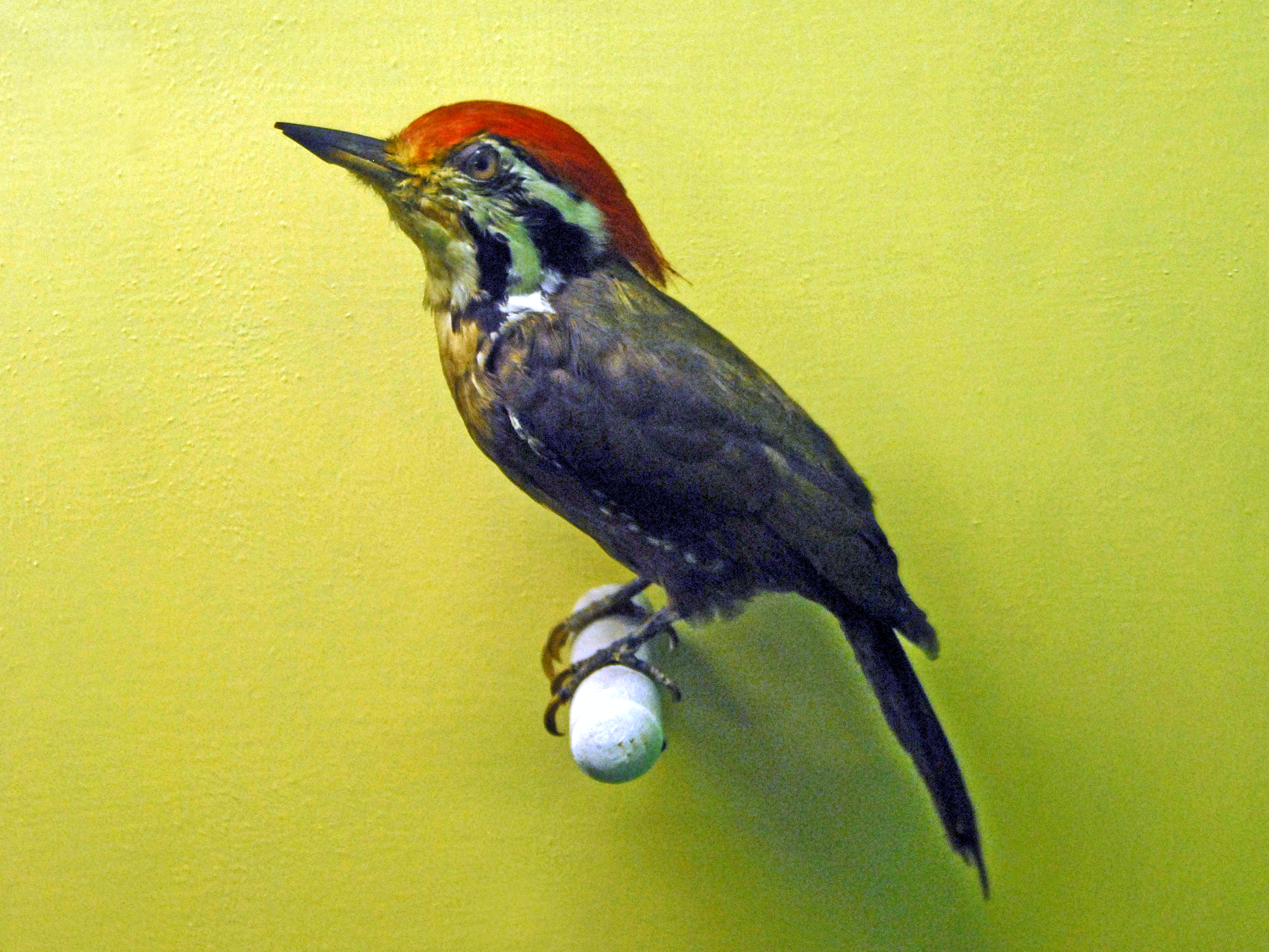
- from Malaysia. Stuffed specimen

Conservation status
- Near Threatened (IUCN 3.1)

Scientific classification
- Kingdom: Animalia
- Phylum: Chordata
- Class: Aves
- Order: Piciformes
- Family: Picidae
- Genus: Gecinulus
- Species: G. rafflesii

Binomial name
- Gecinulus rafflesii (Vigors, 1830)

= Olive-backed woodpecker =

Species of bird

The olive-backed woodpecker (Gecinulus rafflesii) is a species of bird in the woodpecker family Picidae that is found in Southeast Asia.

== Taxonomy ==
The olive-backed woodpecker was described by the Irish zoologist Nicholas Aylward Vigors in 1830 from a specimen collected by Stamford Raffles. Vigors coined the binomial name Picus rafflesii, with the specific epithet chosen to honour the memory of Raffles. The type location is Sumatra. The species was then placed in the genus Dinopium that was introduced by the French polymath Constantine Samuel Rafinesque in 1814.

A large phylogenetic study of the woodpecker family Picidae published in 2017 found that the olive-backed woodpecker (Gecinulus rafflesii) is more closely related to the pale-headed woodpecker (Gecinulus grantia). It may, therefore, be more appropriately assigned to the genus Chloropicoides.

Two subspecies are recognised:

- G. r. rafflesii (Vigors, 1830) – south Myanmar, southwest Thailand, Malay Peninsula, Sumatra and Bangka Island (east of Sumatra)
- G. r. dulitense Delacour, 1946 – Borneo

== Description ==
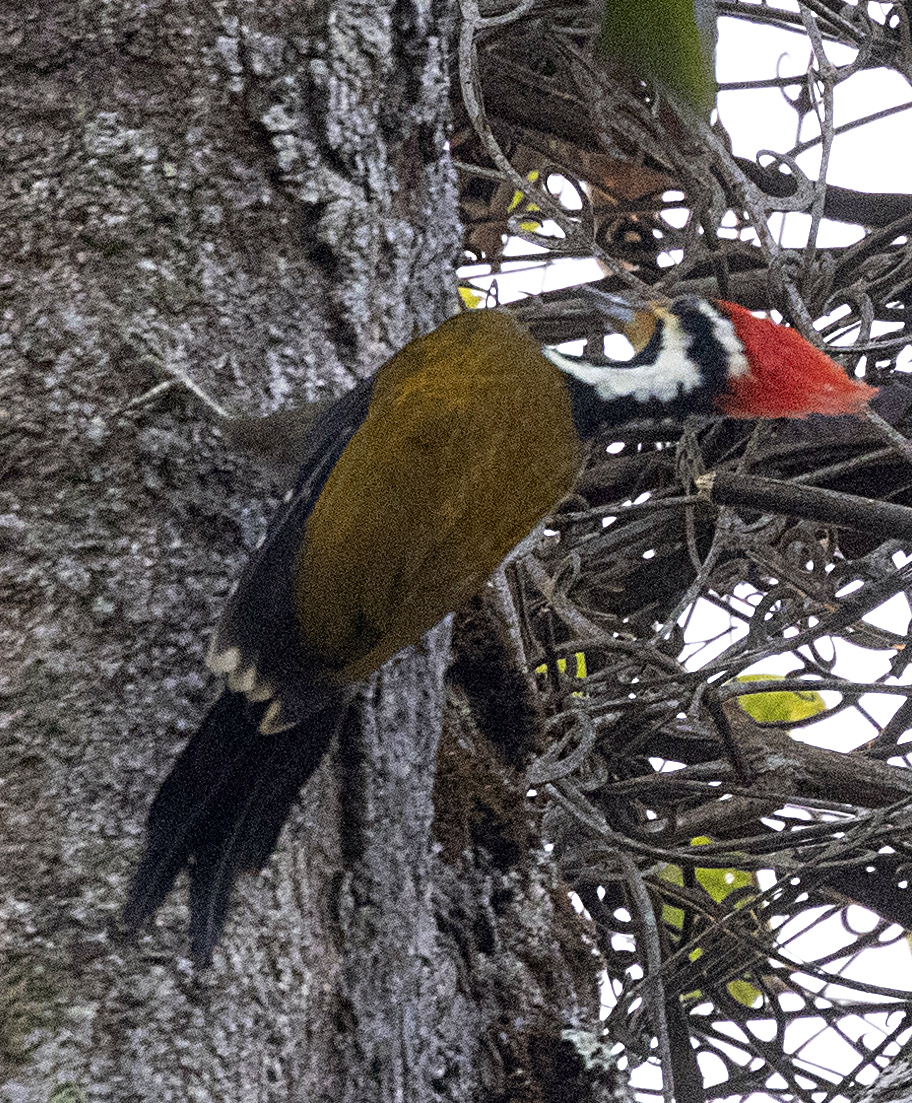
Olive-backed Woodpecker, Thailand 2023 (photo: Gary L. Clark)

The olive-backed woodpecker has yellow-green upperparts and gray-olive underparts. The side of the head has two black and white stripes. The male has a large red crest, the female has a smaller black crest.

== Distribution and habitat ==
The olive-backed woodpecker has a wide range in Southeast Asia, occurring in Myanmar, Thailand, Malaysia, Singapore, Brunei, and Indonesia (on the islands of Borneo and Sumatra). Its natural habitats are subtropical or tropical moist lowland, mangrove and montane forests; the species avoids clearings and secondary forest.

== Conservation ==
Gecinulus rafflesii is threatened by illegal deforestation due to the development of palm oil plantations and the deliberate targeting of primary forest wood. These practices of deforestation even continue in protected areas. The total population of this bird is unknown but it is thought to be uncommon. It is currently classified as Near threatened by the IUCN.
