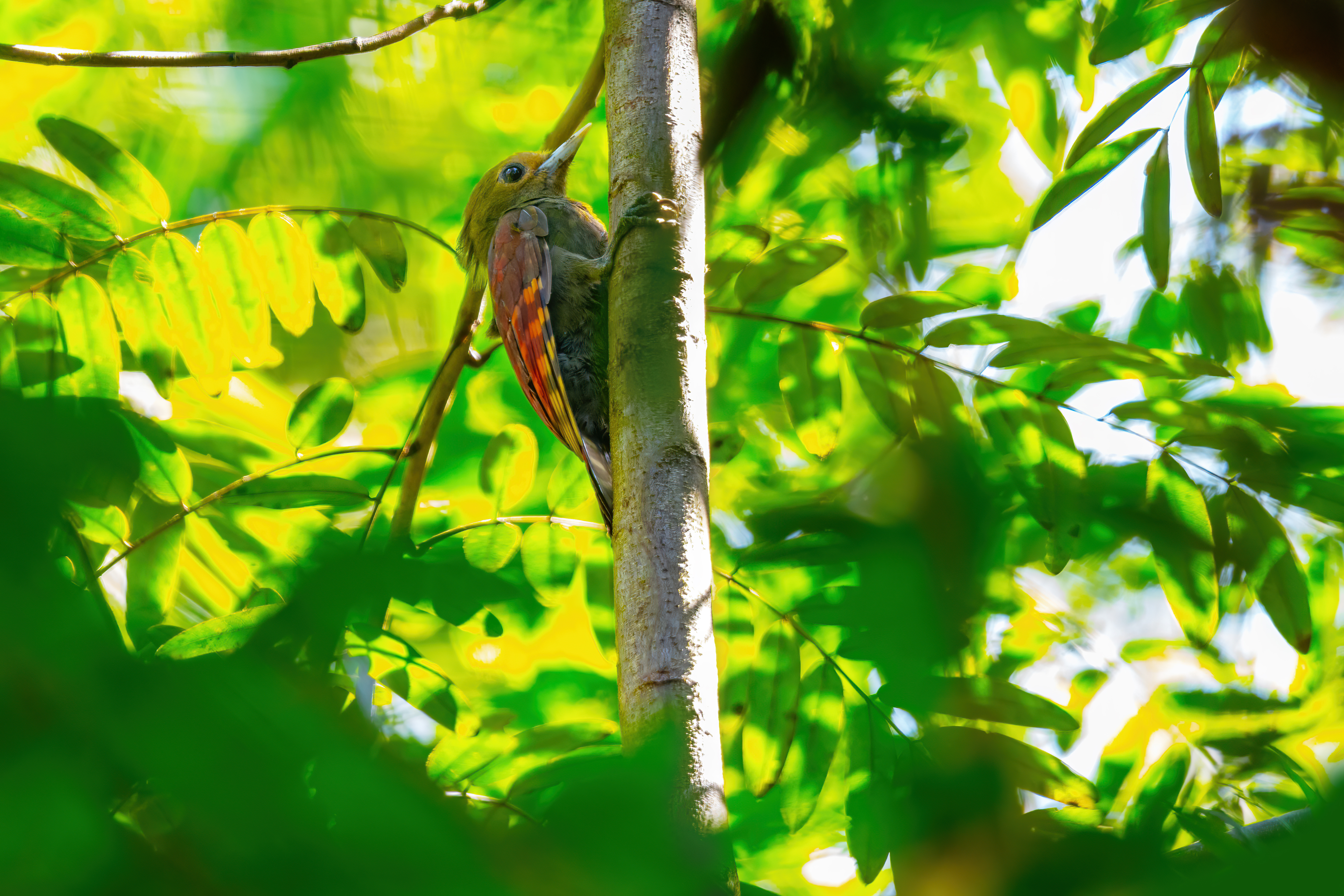

Conservation status
- Least Concern (IUCN 3.1)

Scientific classification
- Kingdom: Animalia
- Phylum: Chordata
- Class: Aves
- Order: Piciformes
- Family: Picidae
- Genus: Gecinulus
- Species: G. grantia

Binomial name
- Gecinulus grantia (Horsfield, 1840)

= Pale-headed woodpecker =

Species of bird

The pale-headed woodpecker (Gecinulus grantia) is a species of bird in the family Picidae. It is found in Bangladesh, Bhutan, China, India, Laos, Myanmar, Nepal, Thailand, and Vietnam. Its natural habitats are subtropical or tropical dry forests and subtropical or tropical moist lowland forests. It is a bamboo specialist, and a montane bird.

A molecular phylogenetic study published in 2017 found that the pale-headed woodpecker was embedded within the genus Dinopium and was a sister species to the olive-backed woodpecker (Dinopium rafflesii).
