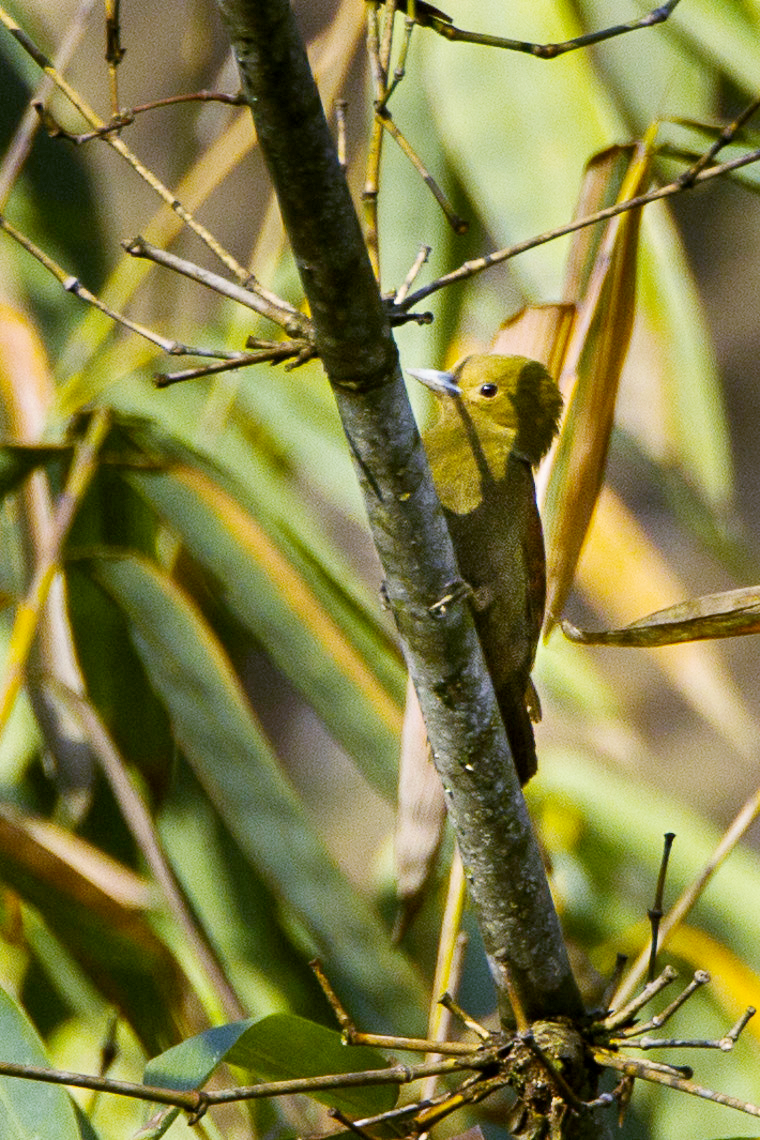
- Pale-headed woodpecker (Gecinulus grantia)

Scientific classification
- Kingdom: Animalia
- Phylum: Chordata
- Class: Aves
- Order: Piciformes
- Family: Picidae
- Tribe: Picini
- Genus: Gecinulus; Blyth, 1845

Type species
- Picus grantia Horsfield, 1840

Species
- see text

= Gecinulus =

Genus of birds

Gecinulus is a genus of birds in the woodpecker family Picidae. The species are found in South and Southeast Asia.

== Taxonomy ==
The genus Gecinulus was introduced by the English zoologist Edward Blyth in 1840 to accommodate the pale-headed woodpecker (Gecinulus grantia). The genus name is a diminutive of the genus name Gecinus which had been introduced by the German ornithologist Friedrich Boie in 1831. Gecinus combines the Classical Greek gē meaning "earth" or "ground" with kineō meaning "to move".

The genus contains three species:

Image	Scientific name	Common name	Distribution
	Gecinulus rafflesii	Olive-backed woodpecker	Myanmar, Thailand, Malaysia, Singapore, Brunei, and Indonesia
	Gecinulus grantia	Pale-headed woodpecker	Bangladesh, Bhutan, China, India, Laos, Myanmar, Nepal, Thailand, and Vietnam
	Gecinulus viridis	Bamboo woodpecker	Myanmar, Laos, Thailand and the Malay Peninsula
