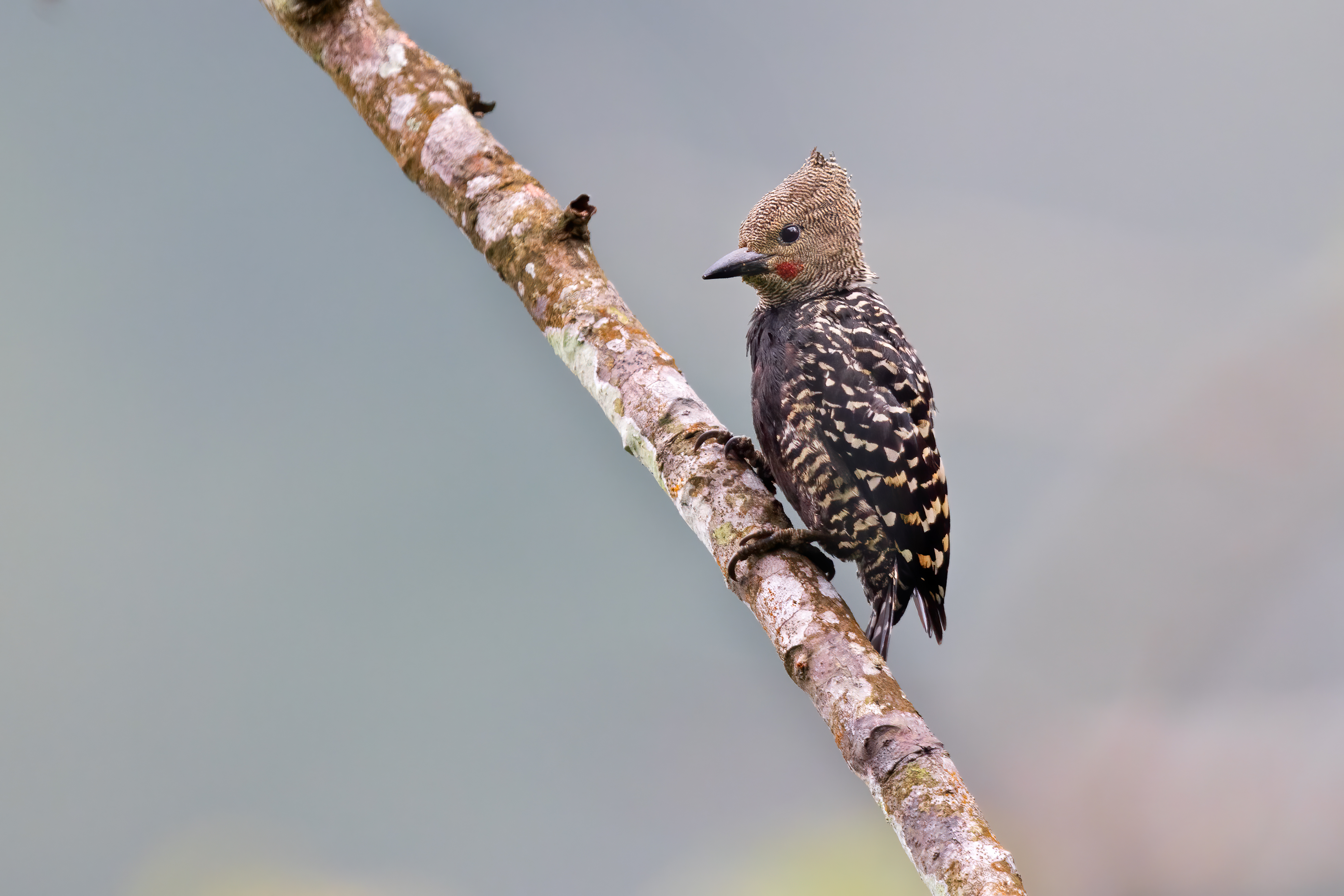
- M. tristis male

Conservation status
- Endangered (IUCN 3.1)

Scientific classification
- Kingdom: Animalia
- Phylum: Chordata
- Class: Aves
- Order: Piciformes
- Family: Picidae
- Genus: Meiglyptes
- Species: M. tristis

Binomial name
- Meiglyptes tristis (Horsfield, 1821)

= Zebra woodpecker =

Species of bird

The zebra woodpecker (Meiglyptes tristis) is a species of bird in the family Picidae. It is found in Java. Its natural habitats are subtropical or tropical dry forests and subtropical or tropical moist lowland forests. It is considered endangered.

The zebra woodpecker was described by the American naturalist Thomas Horsfield in 1821 under the binomial name Picus tristis from a specimen collected in Java. The specific epithet tristis is Latin for "sad" or "gloomy". The species is now placed in the genus Meiglyptes that was introduced by the English naturalist William Swainson in 1837.

The zebra woodpecker is a monotypic species, but it was previously considered conspecific with the buff-rumped woodpecker as two subspecies.

== Habitat ==
It is found in plantations of coconuts, rubber, and silk plants; villages that border secondary forest; mangroves; and polyculture areas. It is known to access disturbed habitats. It is disputed whether zebra woodpeckers are found within primary and secondary forests.
