= List of endemic birds of the Philippines =

This article is one of a series providing information about endemism among birds in the world's various zoogeographic zones.

== Patterns of endemism ==
The Wild Bird Club of the Philippines has a checklist of the birds of the Philippines which follows the IOC World Bird List. Of these 260 bird species endemic to the Philippines. Many of these are restricted to specific islands, particularly Luzon, Mindanao, and Palawan. The number of endemic species recognized in the Philippines has increased in recent years, mainly due to "splits" of species and, to a much lesser extent, due to the discovery of previously unknown species. An example of splitting is the division of the erstwhile species Philippine hawk-owl (Ninox scutulata) into seven species, now called by the name of this-or-that boobook (Luzon boobook, Mindoro boobook, etc. see the list below). Another example is the split of the erstwhile tarictric hornbill (Penelopides panini), itself a Philippines endemic, into four or five separate species (Visayan hornbill, Luzon hornbill, Mindoro hornbill, Mindanao hornbill and possibly Samar hornbill, which may or may not be distinct from the Mindanao hornbill). The split of the greater flameback (Chrysocolaptes lucidus) is another example as it has been split into eight species, four of which are endemic to the Philippines (Luzon flameback, yellow-faced flameback, buff-spotted flameback and red-headed flameback).

In addition to splitting, there has been much taxonomic reassignment of species to new families, particularly affecting the babblers, many of which are now assigned to Locustellidae (grass warblers) or Zosteropidae (white-eyes).

However the taxonomy is organized, only Indonesia, Brazil and Australia exceed the Philippines for number of endemic bird species, and these are much larger countries. There are seven distinct Endemic Bird Areas in the Philippines: (1) Mindoro, (2) Luzon, (3) Negros and Panay, (4) Cebu, (5) Mindanao and the Eastern Visayas, (6) the Sulu Archipelago and (7) Palawan.

In the context of Philippines bird endemics, the rhabdornis merit special discussion. The affinities of these birds with other species has long been under debate. In the past, many taxonomists considered the rhabdornis to form a distinct endemic family of birds restricted to the Philippines (Rhabdornithidae). Other taxonomists have considered the rhabdornis' to be a form of creeper (Certhiidae). Recent study tends to consider the rhabdornis to form a genus within the starling family (Sturnidae), although this view may be subject to further revision. Four species of rhabdornis are currently recognized (strip-sided, long-billed, stripe-breasted and Visayan). Whether or not the rhabdornis represent an endemic Philippines family, the four rhabdornis species are all endemic to the Philippines.

Many species of Philippine birds are also found in the Talaud Islands north of Sulawesi, which are part of Indonesia. Technically, those birds are not Philippine endemics. However, considering the small size and remote location of the Talaud Islands, it may be justified to consider those species as Philippine endemics for practical purposes. Individual cases are discussed below.

Many of the Philippine endemic species are rare and endangered; two of the birds are possibly extinct.

== List of species ==
The species listed follow the taxonomic order of A Guide to the Birds of the Philippines by Robert Kennedy et al. The English names of some birds have been subject to recent change; in those cases an "also-known-as" (aka) is indicated. Some deviation from the Kennedy taxonomic order has been necessary due to reassignment of species to different families by the International Ornithological Committee.

- Philippine duck, Anas luzonica
- Philippine serpent eagle, Spilornis holospilus
- Philippine eagle, Pithecophaga jefferyi
- Philippine hawk-eagle, Nisaetus philippensis
- Pinsker's hawk-eagle, Nisaetus pinskeri
- Philippine falconet, Microhierax erythrogenys
- Palawan peacock-pheasant, Polyplectron napoleonis
- Worcester's buttonquail, Turnix worcesteri
- Spotted buttonquail, Turnix ocellata
- Luzon rail aka brown-banded rail, Lewinia mirifica
- Calayan rail, Aptenorallus calayanensis
- Plain bush-hen, Amaurornis olivacea
- Bukidnon woodcock, Scolapax bukidnonensis
- Philippine green pigeon, Treron axillaris
- White-eared brown dove, Phapitreron leucotis
- Amethyst brown dove, Phapitreron amethystina
- Dark-eared brown dove, Phapitreron brunneiceps
- Tawitawi brown dove, Phapitreron cinereiceps
- Flame-breasted fruit-dove, Ptilinopus marchei
- Cream-breasted fruit-dove, Ptilinopus merrilli
- Yellow-breasted fruit-dove, Ptilinopus occipitalis
- Black-chinned fruit-dove, Ptilinopus leclandheri
- Negros fruit-dove, Ptilinopus arcanus (possibly extinct)
- Pink-bellied imperial-pigeon, Ducula poliocephala
- Spotted imperial-pigeon, Ducula carola
- Philippine collared dove, Streptopelia tenuirostris
- Luzon bleeding-heart, Gallicolumba luzonica
- Mindanao bleeding-heart, Gallicomba criniger
- Sulu bleeding-heart, Gallicolumba menagei (possibly extinct)
- Negros bleeding-heart, Gallicolumba keayi
- Mindoro bleeding-heart, Gallicolumba platenae
- Mindanao lorikeet, Trichoglossus johnstoniae
- Guaiabero, Bolbopsittacus lunulatus
- Philippine cockatoo, Cacatua haematuropgia
- Green racquet-tail, Prioniturus luconensis
- Luzon racquet-tail, Prioniturus montanus
- Mindoro racket-tail, Prioniturus mindorensis
- Blue-headed racquet-tail, Prioniturus platenae
- Mindanao racquet-tail, Prioniturus waterstradti
- Blue-winged racquet-tail, Prioniturus verticalis
- Blue-crowned racquet-tail, Prioniturus discurus
- Philippine hanging-parrot aka Colasisi, Loriculus philippensis
- Philippine hawk-cuckoo, Hierococcyx pectoralis
- Philippine drongo-cuckoo, Surniculus velutinus
- Scale-feathered malkoha, Dasylophus cumingi
- Red-crested malkoha, Dasylophus superciliosus
- Black-hooded coucal, Centropus steerii
- Philippine coucal, Centropus viridis
- Black-faced coucal, Centropus melanops
- Rufous coucal, Centropus unirfus
- Mindoro scops-owl, Otus mindorensis
- Luzon scops-owl, Otus longicornis
- Mantanani scops-owl, Otus mantananensis
- Palawan scops-owl, Otus fuliginosus
- Philippine scops-owl, Otus megalotis
- Mindanao scops-owl, Otus mirus
- Giant scops owl, Otus gurneyi
- Philippine eagle-owl, Buba philippensis
- Luzon boobook, Ninox philippensis
- Chocolate boobook, Ninox randi
- Mindanao boobook, Ninox spilocephala
- Mindoro boobook, Ninox mindorensis
- Romblon boobook, Ninox spilonotus
- Cebu boobook, Ninox rumseyi
- Camiguin boobook, Ninox leventisi
- Sulu boobook, Ninox reyi
- Philippine frogmouth, Batrachostomus septimus
- Philippine nightjar, Caprimulgus manillensis
- Whitehead's swiftlet, Aerodramus whiteheadi
- Ameline swiftlet, Aerodramus amelis
- Philippine swiftlet, Aerodramus mearnsi
- Pygmy swiftlet, Collocalia troglodytes
- Gray-rumped swiftlet, Collocalia marginata
- Philippine spine-tailed swift, Mearnsia picina
- Philippine trogon, Harpactes ardens
- Indigo-banded kingfisher, Ceyx cyanopecta
- Northern silvery kingfisher, Ceyx flumenicola
- Southern silvery kingfisher, Ceyx argentatus
- Philippine dwarf kingfisher, Ceyx melanurus
- Rufous-lored kingfisher, Todiramphus winchelli
- Spotted kingfisher aka spotted wood-kingfisher, Actenoides lindsayi
- Blue-capped kingfisher aka blue-capped wood-kingfisher aka Hombron's wood-kingfisher, Actenoides hombroni
- Rufous-crowned bee-eater, Merops americanus
- Visayan hornbill, Penelopides panini
- Luzon hornbill, Penelopides manillae
- Mindoro hornbill, Penelopides mindorensis
- Samar hornbill, Penelopides samarensis
- Mindanao hornbill, Penelopides affinis
- Writhed-billed hornbill aka Walden's hornbill, Rhabdotorrhinus waldeni
- Writhed hornbill, Rhabdotorrhinus leucocephalus
- Sulu hornbill, Anthracoceros montani
- Palawan hornbill, Anthracoceros marchei
- Rufous hornbill, Buceros hydrocorax
- Philippine woodpecker, Yungipicus maculatus
- Northern sooty woodpecker, Mulleripicus funebris
- Southern sooty woodpecker, Mulleripicus fuliginosus
- Luzon flameback, Chrysocolaptes haematribon
- Yellow-faced flameback, Chrysocolaptes xanthocephalus
- Buff-spotted flameback, Chrysocolaptes lucidus
- Red-headed flameback, Chrysocolaptes erythrocephalus
- Wattled broadbill, Eurylaimus steeri
- Visayan broadbill, Eurylaimus samarensis
- Whiskered pitta, Erythropitta kochi
- Philippine pitta, Erythropitta eryhthrogaster
- Azure-breasted pitta aka Steer's pitta, Pitta steeri
- Blackish cuckoo-shrike, Analisoma coerelescens
- White-winged cuckoo-shrike, Analisoma ostenta
- Black-bibbed cuckoo-shrike, Edalisoma mindanense
- McGregor's cuckoo-shrike, Malindangia mcgregori
- Black-and-white triller, Lalage melanoleuca
- Philippine leafbird, Chloropsis flavipennis
- Yellow-throated leafbird, Chloropsis palawanensis
- Yellow-wattled bulbul, Brachypodius urostictus
- Ashy-fronted bulbul, Pycnonotus cinereifrons
- Gray-throated bulbul aka Palawan bulbul, Alophoixus frater
- Sulphur-bellied bulbul, Iole palawanensis
- Philippine bulbul, Hypsipetes philippinus
- Zamboanga bulbul, Hypsipetes rufigularis
- Streak-breasted bulbul, Hypsipetes siquijorensis
- Yellowish bulbul, Hypsipetes everetti
- Camiguin bulbul, Hypsipetes catarmanensis
- Balicassiao, Dicrurus balicassius
- Philippine oriole, Oriolus steeri
- Isabela oriole, Oriolus isabellae
- Philippine fairy-bluebird, Irena cyanogaster
- Palawan fairy-bluebird, Irena tweeddalii
- Palawan tit, Periparus amabilis
- Elegant tit, Periparus elegans
- White-fronted tit, Sittiparus semilarvatus
- Sulphur-billed nuthatch, Sitta oenochlamys
- Ashy-headed babbler, Pellorneum cinereiceps
- Palawan babbler, Malacopteron palawanense
- Falcated wren-babbler, Ptilocichla falcata
- Striated wren-babbler, Ptilocichla mindanensis
- Rusty-crowned babbler, Sterrhoptilus capitalis
- Black-crowned babbler, Sterrhoptilus nigrocapitatis
- Calabarzon babbler, Sterrhoptilus affinis
- Golden-crowned babbler, Sterrhoptilus dennistouni
- Brown tit-babbler, Macronus striaticeps
- Leyte plumed-warbler, split from miniature tit-babbler, Leyte form (now classified as a type of cisticola), Micromacronus leytensis
- Mindanao plumed-warbler, split from miniature tit-babbler, Mindanao form (now classified as a type of cisticola), Micromacronus sordidus
- Visayan pygmy-babbler, Dasycrotapha pygmaea
- Mindanao pygmy-babbler, Dasycrotapha plateni
- Flame-templed babbler, Dasycrotapha speciosa
- Chestnut-faced babbler, Zosterornis whiteheadi
- Luzon striped-babbler, Zosterornis striatus
- Panay striped-babbler, Zosterornis latistriatus
- Negros striped-babbler, Zosterornis nigrorum
- Palawan striped-babbler, Zosterornis hypogrammicus
- Ashy thrush, Geokichla cinerea
- Philippine leaf-warbler, Phylloscopus olivaceous
- Lemon-throated leaf-warbler, Phylloscopus cebuensis
- Philippine tailorbird, Orthotomus castaneiceps
- Gray-backed tailorbird, Orthotomus derbianus
- Green-backed tailorbird, Orthotomus chloronotus
- Yellow-breasted tailorbird, Orthotomus samarensis
- White-browed tailorbird, Orthotomus nigriceps
- White-eared tailorbird, Orthotomus cinereiceps
- Rufous-fronted tailorbird, Orthotomus frontalis
- Rufous-headed tailorbird (now classified as a type of bush-warbler), Phyllergates heterolaemus
- Philippine bush-warbler, Horornis seebohmi
- Benguet bush-warbler (now classified as a type of grassbird), Locustella seebohmi
- Long-tailed bush-warbler (now classified as a type of grassbird), Locustella caudatus
- Cordillera ground warbler (formerly classified as a babbler, now as a grassbird), Robsonius rabori
- Sierra Madre ground warbler (formerly classified as a babbler, now as a grassbird), Robsonius thompsoni
- Bicol ground warbler (formerly classified as a babbler, now as a grassbird), Robsonius sorsogonensis
- Bagobo babbler (now classified as a type of Old World flycatcher), Leonardina woodi
- White-throated jungle flycatcher, Vauriella albigularis
- Rusty-flanked jungle-flycatcher aka white-browed jungle-flycatcher aka Luzon jungle flycatcher, Vauriella insignis
- Mindanao jungle-flycatcher aka Goodfellow's jungle-flycatcher, Vauriella goodfellowi
- Ashy-breasted flycatcher, Muscicapa randi
- Little slaty flycatcher, Ficedula basilanica
- Palawan flycatcher, Ficedula platenae
- Cryptic flycatcher, Ficedula crypta
- Blue-breasted flycatcher, Cyornis herioti
- Palawan blue-flycatcher, Cyornis lemprieri
- Philippine magpie-robin, Copsychus mindanensis
- White-browed shama, Copsychus luzoneinsis
- Visayan shama, Copsychus superciliaris
- White-vented shama, Copsychus niger
- Black shama, Copsychus cebuensis
- Luzon redstart, Phoenicurus bicolor
- Philippine pied fantail, Rhipidura nigritorquis
- Mindanao blue fantail, Rhipidura superciliaris
- Visayan blue fantail, Rhipidura samarensis
- Blue-headed fantail, Rhipidura cyaniceps
- Visayan fantail, Rhipidura albiventris
- Black-and-cinnamon fantail, Rhipidura nigrocinnamomea
- Tablas fantail, Rhipidura sauli
- Rufous paradise-flycatcher, Terpsiphone cinnamomea
- Blue paradise-flycatcher, Terpsiphone cyanescens
- Celestial monarch, Hypothymis coelestis
- Short-crested monarch, Hypothymis helenae
- Green-backed whistler, Pachycephala albiventris
- White-vented whistler, Pachycephala homeyeri
- Yellow-bellied whistler, Pachycephala philippinensis
- Gray-capped shrike, Lanius validirostris
- Small crow, Corvus samarensis
- Palawan crow, Corvus pusillus
- Coleto, Sarcops calvus
- Apo myna, Goodfellowia miranda
- Stripe-sided rhabdornis, Rhabdornis mystacalis
- Long-billed rhabdornis, Rhabdornis grandis
- Stripe-breasted rhabdornis, Rhabdornis inornatus
- Visayan rhabdornis, Rhabdornis rabori
- Gray-throated sunbird, Anthreptes griseigularis
- Purple-throated sunbird Leptocoma sperata
- Garden sunbird Cinnyris jugularis - split from the olive-backed sunbird
- Palawan sunbird Cinnyris aurora - split from the olive-backed sunbird
- Gray-hooded sunbird, Aethopyga primigenia
- Apo sunbird, Aethopyga boltoni
- Lina's sunbird, Aethopyga linaraborae
- Flaming sunbird, Aethopyga flagrans
- Maroon-naped sunbird, Aethopyga guimarasensis; split from the flaming sunbird
- Metallic-winged sunbird, Aethopyga pulcherrima - now contains the lump of Luzon sunbird and Bohol sunbird
- Lovely sunbird, Aethopyga shelleyi
- Handsome sunbird, Aethopyga bella
- Pale spiderhunter, Arachnothera dilutior - split from the little spiderhunter
- Naked-faced spiderhunter, Arachnothera clarae
- Orange-tufted spiderhunter, Arachnothera flammifera - split from the little spiderhunter
- Olive-backed flowerpecker, Prionochilus olivaceous
- Palawan flowerpecker, Prionochilus plateni
- Olive-capped flowerpecker, Dicaeum nigrilore
- Flame-crowned flowerpecker, Dicaeum kampalili
- Yellow-crowned flowerpecker, Dicaeum anthonyi
- Bicolored flowerpecker, Dicaeum bicolor
- Whiskered flowerpecker, Dicaeum proprium
- Cebu flowerpecker, Dicaeum quadricolor
- Red-keeled flowerpecker, Dicaeum australe
- Scarlet-collared flowerpecker, Dicaeum retrocinctum
- Black-belted flowerpecker, Dicaeum haematostictum
- Buzzing flowerpecker, Dicaeum hypoleucum
- Pygmy flowerpecker, Dicaeum pygmaeum
- Lowland white-eye, Zosterops meyeni
- Yellowish white-eye, Zosterops nigrorum
- Mindanao white-eye, Lophozosterops goodfellowi
- Cinnamon ibon (now classified as an Old World sparrow, Passeridae), Hypocryptadius cinnamomeus
- Green-faced parrotfinch, Erythrura viridifacies
- Red-eared parrotfinch, Erythrura coloria
- Mindanao serin, Chrysocorythus mindanensis, split from the Mountain serin
- White-cheeked bullfinch, Pyrrhula leucogenis

== Difficult cases ==
1. The Philippine form of the reddish cuckoo-dove, Macropygia phasianella, is considered by some authorities to be a separate species under the name Philippine cuckoo-dove, Macropygia tenuirostris. However, it is not clear whether the form of the bird found in Borneo should be considered M. phasianella, M. tenuirostris, or a separate species. For now, the Philippine cuckoo-dove is not included in the endemic list.
2. The Philippine collared-dove, Streptopelia dusumieri, has been recorded in northern Borneo, but not since the 1960s. The bird has also been introduced on some of the Mariana Islands. This bird is included in the Philippines endemic list since its current presence in Borneo is not confirmed and its presence in the Mariana Islands is man made.
3. The gray imperial-pigeon, Ducula pickeringii, is found exclusively on a few small islands on the south and southwest side of the main Philippines Archipelago, mainly islands in the Sulu Sea and offshore of Palawan. Most of the islands where the gray imperial-pigeon is found are part of the Philippines, although it is also found on two island groups in Indonesia (the very small Derawan Islands off of eastern Borneo and the larger Talaud Island group north of Sulawesi). The bird is not included in the Philippines endemic list.
4. While found mainly in the Philippines, the blue-naped parrot, Tanygnathus lucionensis, is also found in the Talaud Island group north of Sulawesi, which is part of Indonesia. The bird is not therefore included in the Philippines endemics list.
5. The Mantanani scops-owl is named after Mantanani Island, a tiny island off the north coast of Sabah, Malaysia (Borneo). However, other than on that small Malaysian island, the bird is found entirely in several small Philippine islands: Sibutu, Tablas, Romblon, the Calamian Islands north of Palawan, the Cuyo Island group. The bird is included in the Philippines endemics list.
6. The Philippines form of the uniform swiftlet, Aerodramus vanikorensis, (itself previously known as the island swiftlet) has recently been designated by the International Ornithological Committee as a different species, the Ameline swiftlet Aerodramus amelis. The Ameline swiftlet is included in the Philippines endemic list.
7. Authorities differ on whether the Samar form of the tarictic hornbill is a distinct species Penelopides samarensis, or whether it is a form of the Mindanao hornbill, Penelopides affinis. It is included in the list of Philippines endemics.
8. The blue-breasted pitta, Erythropitta erythrogaster, is a recent split from the Australasian "red-bellied" pitta group. The blue-breasted pitta is found throughout the Philippines and also in the Talaud Island group of Indonesia. For now, it is included in the Philippines endemic list.
9. There is a consideration that the Mindoro form and the Visayan form of the Philippine bulbul, Hypsipetes philippinus, should be classed as separate species, Mindoro bulbul, Hypsipetes mindorensis, and Visayan bulbul, Hypsipetes guimarasensis, respectively, but this seems to be not quite agreed yet amongst the authorities. For now, only the Philippine bulbul is listed as a Philippines endemic.
10. The Palawan form of the Asian fairy-bluebird, Irena puella, is coming to be viewed as a potentially different species Irena tweeddalii. Since this seems to be still in discussion, this bird in not included in the Philippines endemic list.
11. The 2021 International Ornithological Committee has approved several splits that increase the number of Philippines endemics. They are as follows: (a) The Philippines versions of the slender-billed crow, Corvus enca, are defined as two new species, small crow, Corvus samarensis, found in the main Philippines islands, and Palawan crow, Corvus pusillus, found on Palawan. (b) The Camiguin form of the yellowish bulbul, Hypsipetes everetti, itself a Philippines endemic, is defined as a new species. The new species is called Camiguin bulbul, Hypsipetes catarmanensis. (c) The endemic black-crowned babbler, Sterrhoptilus nigrocapitatus, has been split, with the form found in Luzon called the Calabarzon babbler, Sterrhoptilus affinis. (d) The Palawn form of the Asian fairy-bluebird, Irena puella, has been defined as a new species, the Palawan fairy-bluebird, Irena tweeddalli. (e) The endemic flame-crowned flowerpecker, Dicaeum anthonyi, has been split into two species called yellow-crowned flowerpecker, Dicaeum anthonyi and flame-crowned flowerpecker, Dicaeum kampalili. The original English name stays with the Mindanao form of the bird, which takes a new Latin name, and original Latin name of the bird stays with the Luzon form, which takes a new English name. (f) The Mindanao form of the mountain serin, Chrysocorythus estherae has been split from the Indonesian forms, with the new name Mindanao serin, Chrysocorythus estherae.
12. Everett's white-eye, Zosterops everetti, previously considered to be distributed widely across SE Asia, including the southern Philippine Islands, has been split by the 2020 International Ornithological Committee Bird List revision, with the Everett's white-eye now considered as restricted to the southern Philippines and the Talaud Island group of Indonesia. The form of the bird found elsewhere in SE Asia is now to be called Hume's white-eye, Zosterops auriventur. The Everett's white-eye is not included in the Philippines endemics list since it is also found in the Talaud Islands.
13. Recent taxonomic changes have drastically reduced the number of endemic babbler species in the Philippines. Eleven endemic Philippine species previously considered babblers have been reassigned to the white-eye family Zosteropidae. In addition, two endemic babblers have been reassigned to the cisticola family Cisticolidae, three endemic babblers have been renamed "ground warblers" and assigned to the grassbird family Locustella and one endemic babbler has been renamed as a robin and assigned to the Old World flycatchers, Muscicapidae. These changes do not alter the total number of Philippine endemic species, but have moved endemic species into new families.

== See also ==
- Lists of biota of the Philippines
- List of threatened species of the Philippines
