= National List of Threatened Terrestrial Fauna of the Philippines =

The National List of Threatened Terrestrial Fauna of the Philippines, also known as the Red List, is a list of endangered species endemic to the Philippines and is maintained by the Department of Environment and Natural Resources (DENR) through its Biodiversity Management Bureau and the Philippine Red List Committee. The list is pursuant to Republic Act No. 9147, or the Wildlife Resources Conservation and Protection Act. Species are assessed solely according to their population in the Philippines and hence may not be in line with other conversation lists such as the IUCN Red List which list the crab-eating macaque (including subspecies the Philippine long-tailed macaque) as vulnerable but is not included in the 2019 release of the Philippines' national Red List.

The list was first released in 2004. In 2019, arachnids and insects were added to the list.

== List ==
The following is the list of critically endangered (CR) and endangered (EN) species included in the National List of Threatened Terrestrial Fauna of the Philippines as per DENR Administrative Order 2019-09. The list below currently does not include fauna classified as vulnerable (VU) and other threatened species (OTS).

=== Mammals ===
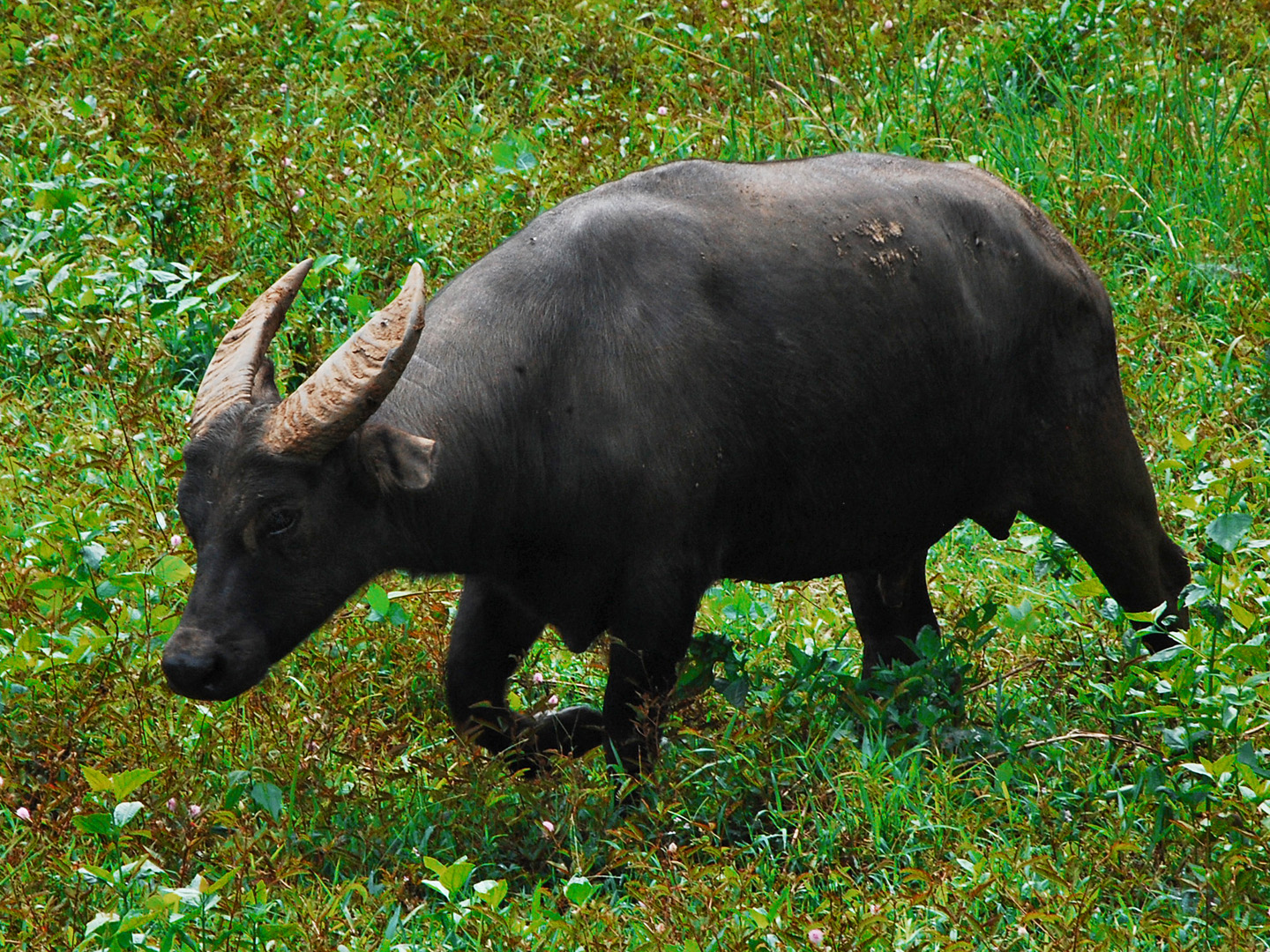
Tamaraw (Bubalus mindorensis)

Common name	Scientific name	Status
Tamaraw	Bubalus mindorensis	CR
Visayan spotted deer	Cervus alfredi	CR
Dugong	Dugong dugon	CR
Dinagat hairy-tailed cloud rat	Crateromys australis	CR
Ilin hairy-tailed cloudrat	Crateromys paulus	CR
Golden-crowned fruit bat	Acerodon jubatus	CR
Philippine bare-backed fruit bat	Dobsonia chapmani	CR
Calamian deer	Cervus calamianensis	EN
Philippine deer	Rusa marianna	EN
Palawan pangolin	Manis culionensis	EN
Panay bushy-tailed cloud rat	Crateromys heaneyi	EN
Philippine tube-nosed fruit bat	Nyctimene rabori	EN
Palawan flying fox	Acerodon leucotis	EN
Giant flying fox	Pteropus vampyrus	EN
Mindoro warty pig	Sus oliveri	EN
Pig (unspecified Sus species from the Sulu Archipelago)	Sus sp. A from the Sulu Archipelago	EN

=== Birds ===
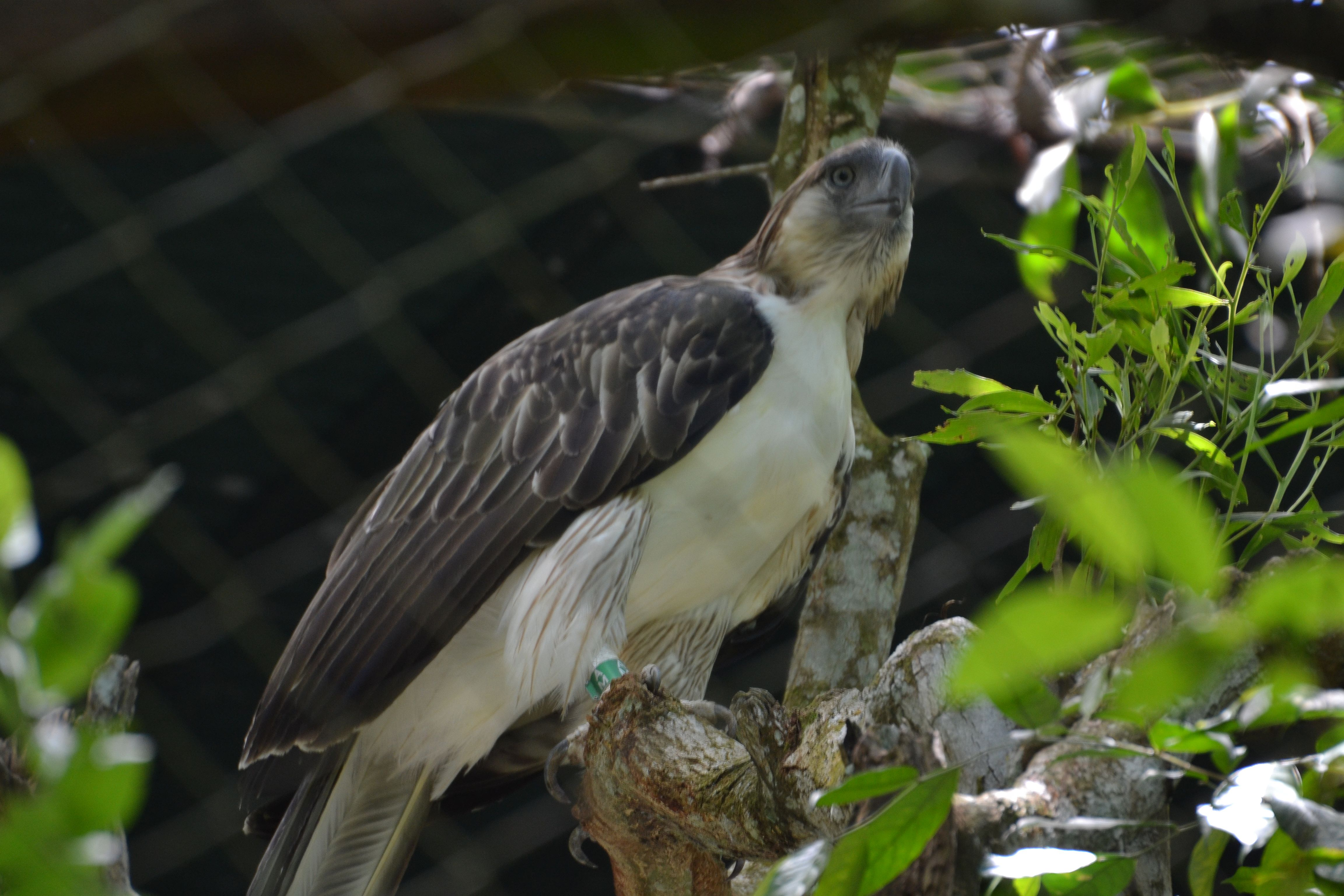
Philippine eagle (Pithecophaga jefferyi)

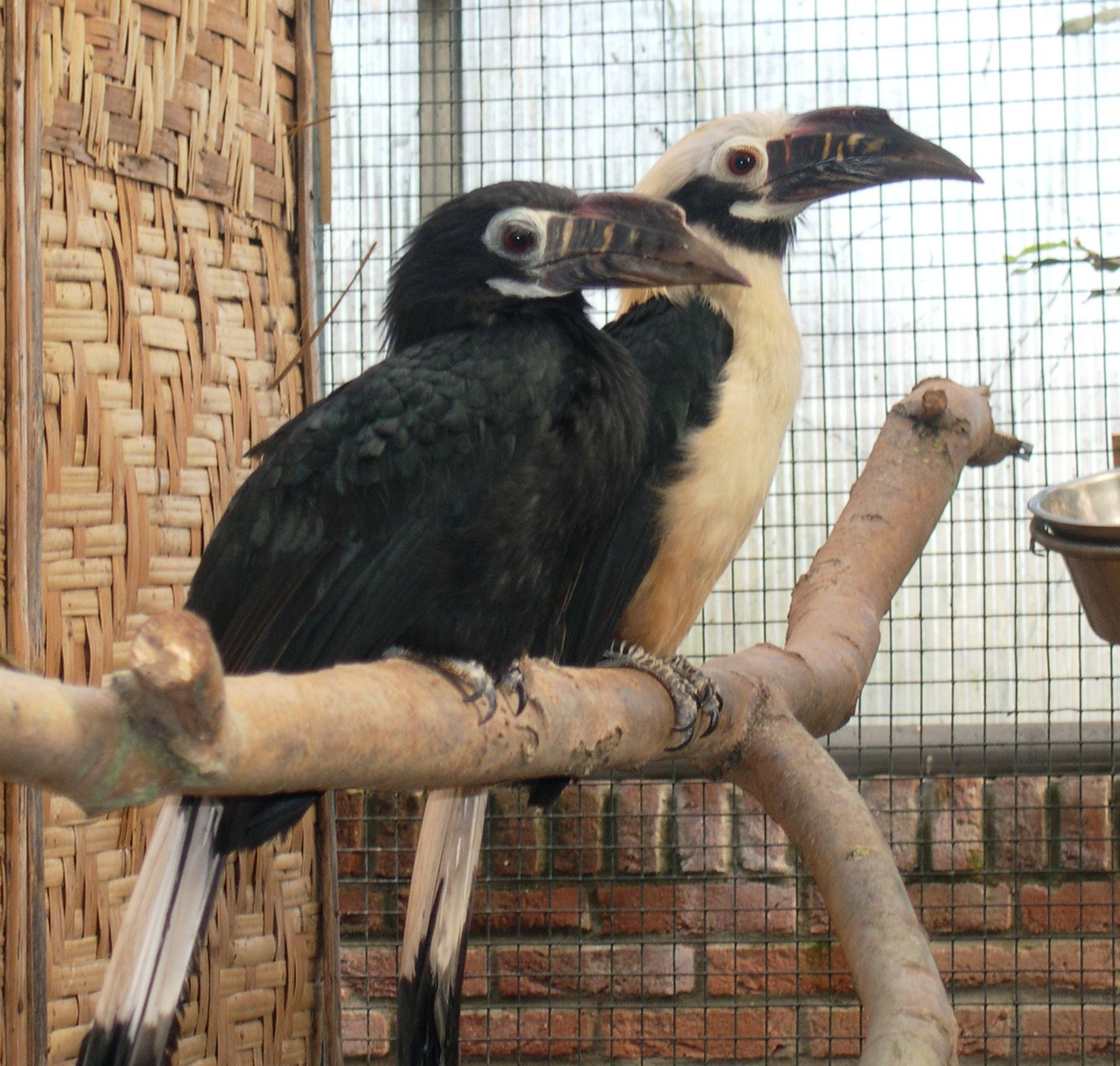
Visayan hornbill (Penelopides panini)

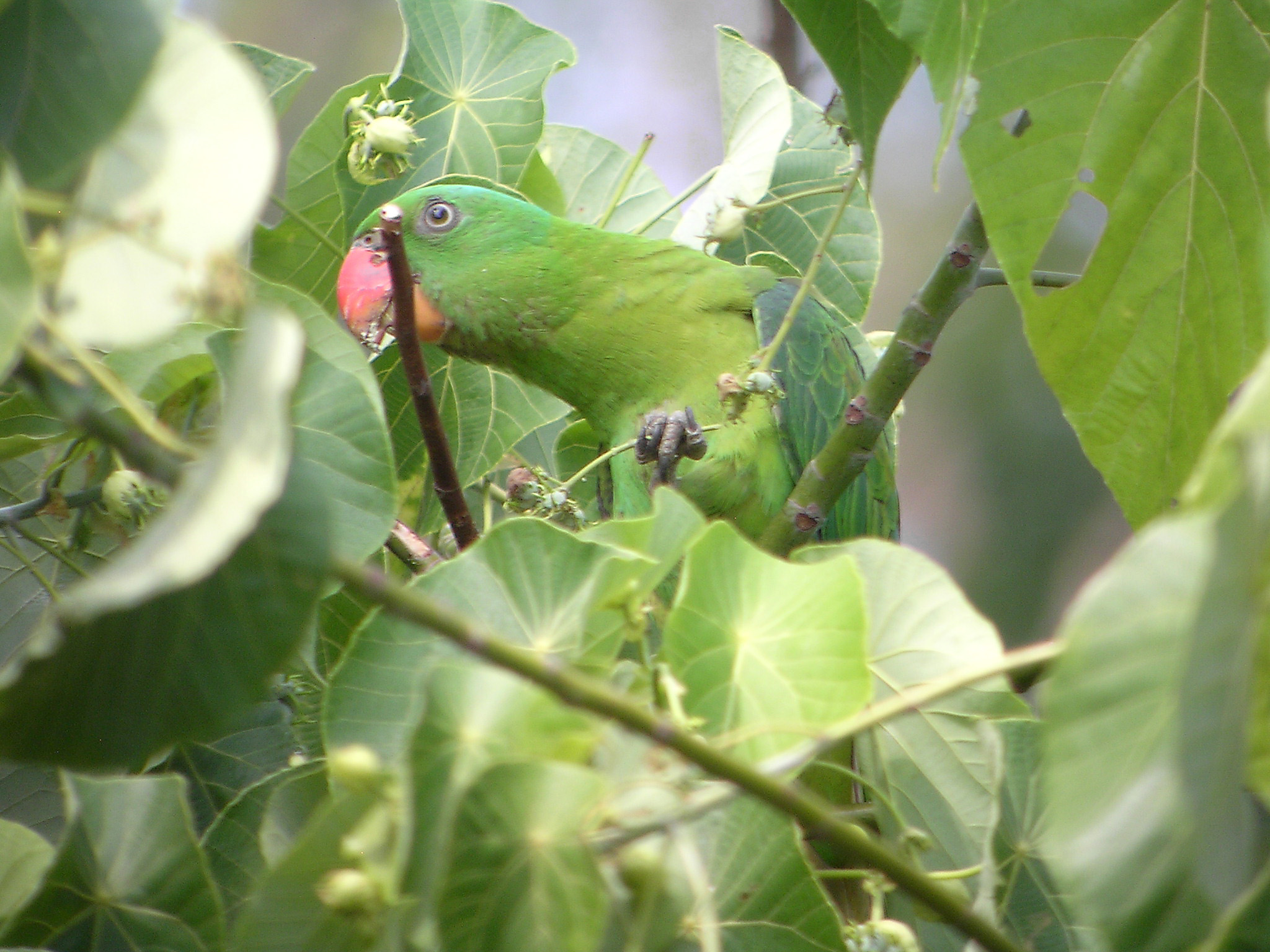
Blue-naped parrot (Tanygnathus lucionensis)

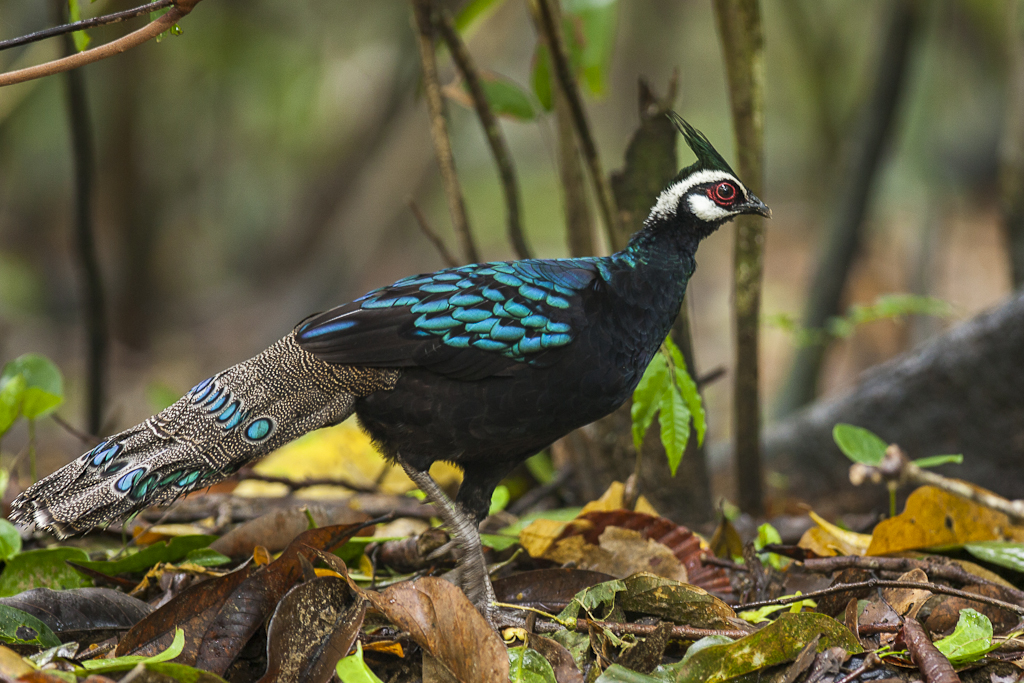
Palawan peacock-pheasant (Palyplectron napoleonis)

Common name	Scientific name	Status
Philippine eagle	Pithecophaga jefferyi	CR
Speckled reed warbler	Acrocephalus sorghophilus	CR
Indigo-banded kingfisher	Ceyx cyanopectus	CR
Baer's pochard	Aythya baeri	CR
Sulu hornbill	Anthracoceros montani	CR
Walden's hornbill	Rhabdotorrhinus waldeni	CR
Visayan hornbill	Penelopides panini	CR
Red-vented cockatoo	Cacatua haematuropygia	CR
Philippine leafbird	Chloropsis flavipennis	CR
Mindoro bleeding-heart	Gallicolumba platenae	CR
Sulu bleeding-heart	Gallicolumba keayi	CR
Negros bleeding-heart	Gallicolumba menagei	CR
Amethyst brown dove	Phapitreron amethystinus	CR
Tawi-Tawi brown dove	Phapitreron cinereiceps	CR
Negros fruit dove	Ptilinopus arcanus	CR
Pink-bellied imperial pigeon	Ducula poliocephala	CR
Black-hooded coucal	Centropus steerii	CR
Cebu flowerpecker	Dicaeum quadricolor	CR
Tablas drongo	Dicrurus menagei	CR
Christmas Island frigatebird	Fregata andrewsi	CR
Sarus crane	Grus antigone	CR
Chinese crested tern	Thalasseus bernsteini	CR
Celestial monarch	Hypothymis coelestis	CR
Isabela oriole	Oriolus isabellae	CR
Colasisi	Loriculus philippensis	CR
Green racket-tail	Prioniturus luconensis	CR
Blue-winged racket-tail	Prioniturus verticalis	CR
Blue-naped parrot	Tanygnathus lucionensis	CR
Blue-backed parrot	Tanygnathus sumatranus	CR
Streak-breasted bulbul	Aypsipetes siquijorensis	CR
Spoon-billed sandpiper	Eurynorhynchus pygmeus	CR
Masked booby	Sula dactylatra	CR
Pinsker's hawk-eagle	Nisaetus pinskeri	EN
Japanese night heron	Gorsachius goisagi	EN
Luzon rufous hornbill	Buceros hydrocorax	EN
Mindoro hornbill	Penelopides mindorensis	EN
Mindanao hornbill	Penelopides affinis	EN
Beach stone-curlew	Esacus magnirostris	EN
Oriental stork	Ciconia boyciana	EN
Island collared dove	Streptopelia bitorquata	EN
Nicobar pigeon	Caloenas nicobarica	EN
Flame-breasted fruit dove	Ramphiculus marchei	EN
Mindoro imperial pigeon	Ducula mindorensis	EN
Spotted imperial pigeon	Ducula carola	EN
Grey imperial pigeon	Ducula pickeringii	EN
Black noddy	Anous minutus	EN
Black shama	Copsychus cebuensis	EN
Ashy-breasted flycatcher	Muscicapa randi	EN
White-throated jungle flycatcher	Vauriella albigularis	EN
Palawan peacock-pheasant	Palyplectron napoleonis	EN
Yellow-faced flameback	Chrysocolaptes xanthocephalus	EN
Red-headed flameback	Chrysocolaptes erythrocephalus	EN
Montane racket-tail	Prioniturus montanus	EN
Mindoro racket-tail	Prioniturus mindorensis	EN
Calayan rail	Gallirallus calayanensis	EN
Brown-banded rail	Lewinia mirificus	EN
Tablas fantail	Rhipidura sauli	EN
Far eastern curlew	Numenius madagascariensis	EN
Spotted redshank	Tringa erythropus	EN
Nordmann's greenshank	Tringa guttifer	EN
Great knot	Calidris tenuirostris	EN
Giant scops owl	Otus gurneyi	EN
Palawan scops owl	Otus fuliginosus	EN
Philippine eagle-owl	Bubo philippensis	EN
Romblon hawk-owl	Ninox spilonota	EN
Cebu hawk-owl	Ninox rumseyi	EN
Camiguin hawk-owl	Ninox leventisi	EN
Brown booby	Sula leucogaster	EN
Black-faced spoonbill	Platalea minor	EN
Worcester's buttonquail	Turnix worcesteri	EN
Negros striped babbler	Zosterornis nigrorum	EN
Flame-templed babbler	Dasycrotapha speciosa	EN

=== Reptiles ===
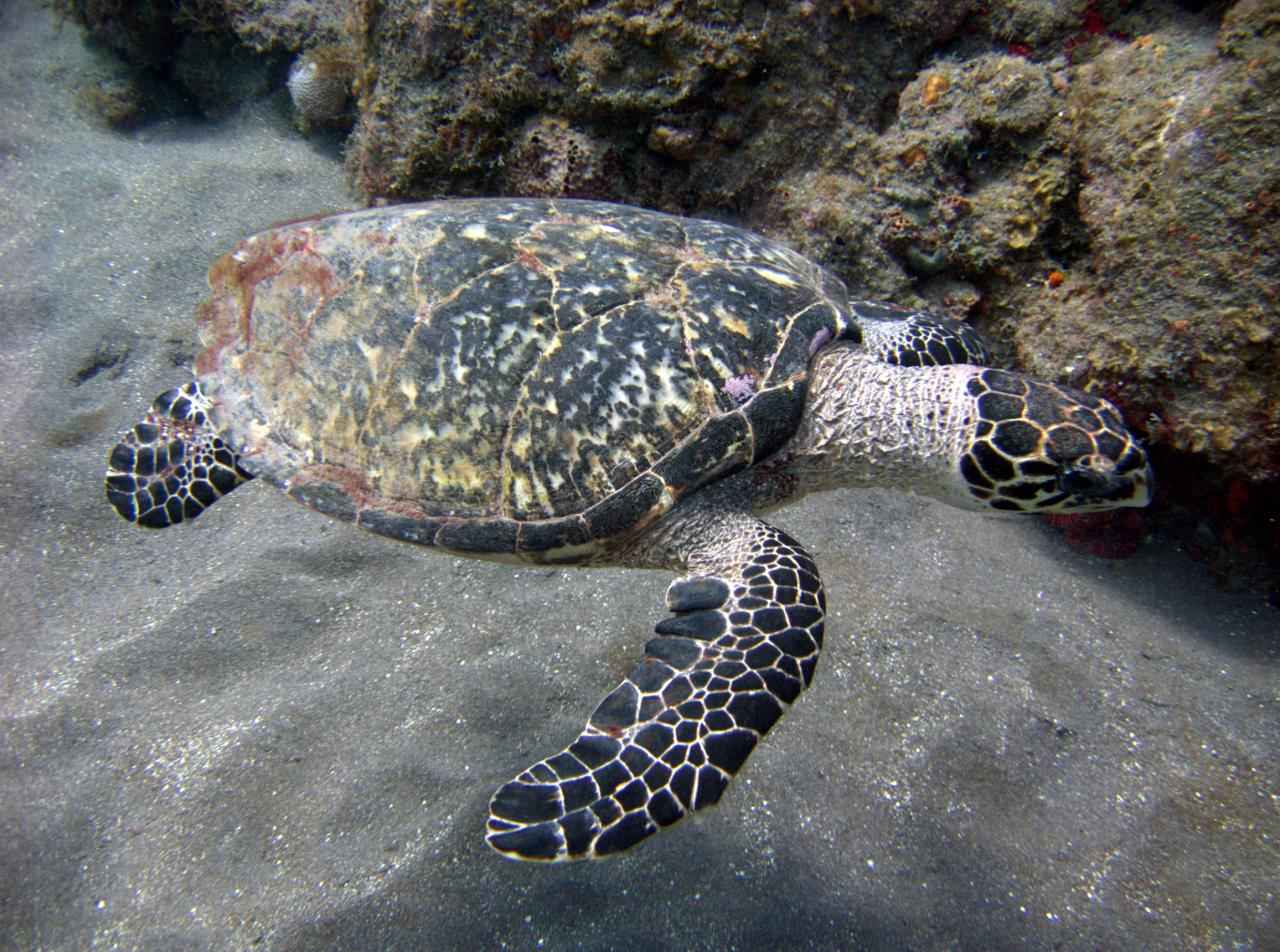
Hawksbill turtle (Eretmochelys imbricata)

Common name	Scientific name	Status
Hawksbill turtle	Eretmochelys imbricata	CR
Philippine crocodile	Crocodylus mindorensis	CR
Indo-Pacific crocodile / saltwater crocodile	Crocodylus porosus	CR
Leatherback turtle	Dermochelys coriacea	CR
Palawan forest turtle	Siebenrockiella leytensis	CR
Panay forest monitor lizard	Varanus mabitang	CR
Loggerhead turtle	Caretta caretta	EN
Green turtle	Chelonia mydas	EN
Olive ridley turtle	Lepidochelys olivacea	EN
Spiny hill turtle	Heosemys spinosa	EN
McGregor's pitviper	Trimeresurus mcgregori	EN
Asian leaf turtle	Cyclemys dentata	VU
Northern Sierra Madre forest monitor lizard	Varanus bitatawa	VU
Gray's monitor lizard	Varanus olivaceus	VU
Southeast Asian box turtle	Cuora amboinensis	OTS

=== Amphibians ===
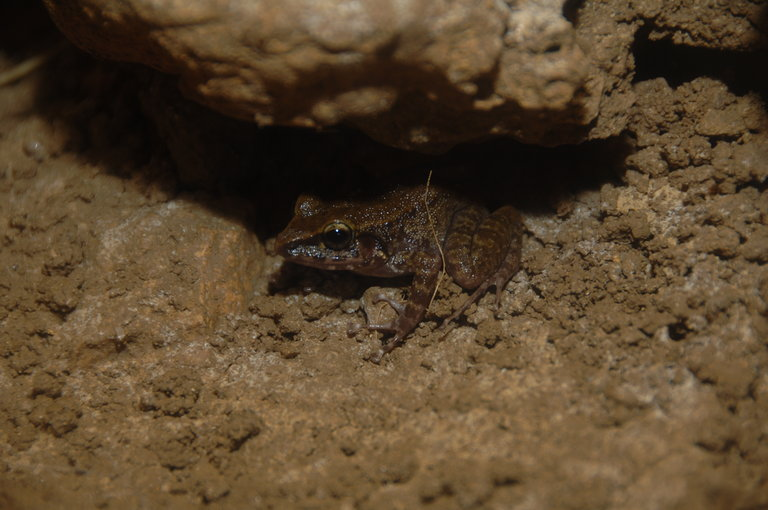
Gigantes limestone frog (Platymantis insulatus)

Common name	Scientific name	Status
Gigantes limestone frog	Platymantis insulatus	CR
Negros limestone frog	Platymantis (Lupacolus) spelaeus	EN

=== Invertebrates ===
Common name	Scientific name	Status
Tree snail	Helicostyla smargadina	CR
—	Coneuplecta turrita	CR
Angat common gem	Poritia solitaria	CR
Masbate brush-footed butterfly	Tanaecia dodong	CR
Cebu brush-footed butterfly	Tanaecia susoni	CR
Jolo brush-footed butterfly	Tanaecia lupina	CR
Miyazaki's nymphalid	Helcyra miyazakii	CR
Leyte swallowtail	Chilasa osmana	CR
Mindanao swallowtail	Chilasa carolinensis	CR
Marinduque swallowtail	Menelaides luzviae	CR
Damselfly	Protosticta plicata	CR
Damselfly	Risiocnemis seidenschwarzi	CR
Hagen's damselfly	Rhinocypha hageni	EN
—	Amemboa (s.str.) philippinensis	EN
Tindongan's oakblue	Arhopala tindongani	EN
Simon's cave cockroach	Nocticola simoni	EN
Antipolo blind cave cockroach	Nocticola caeca	EN
Damselfly	Sulcosticta striata	EN

== See also ==
- List of threatened species of the Philippines, as listed by the International Union for Conservation of Nature
