= Buad =

Buad may refer to:

- Buad Island, Samar Province, Philippines
- Buad (barangay), Lumbatan, Lanao del Sur, Philippines
