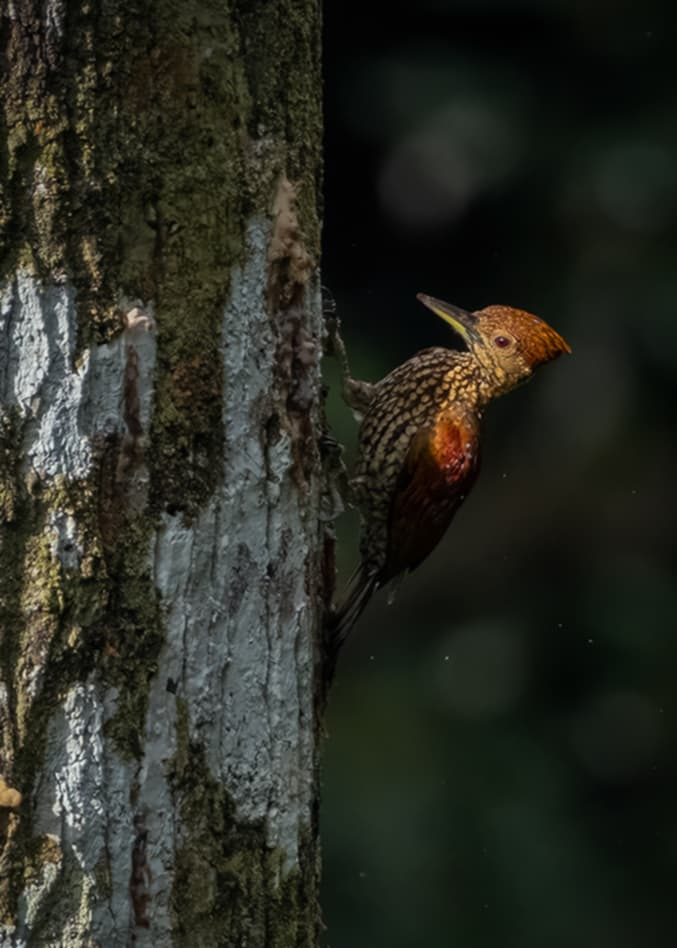
- ssp. lucidus
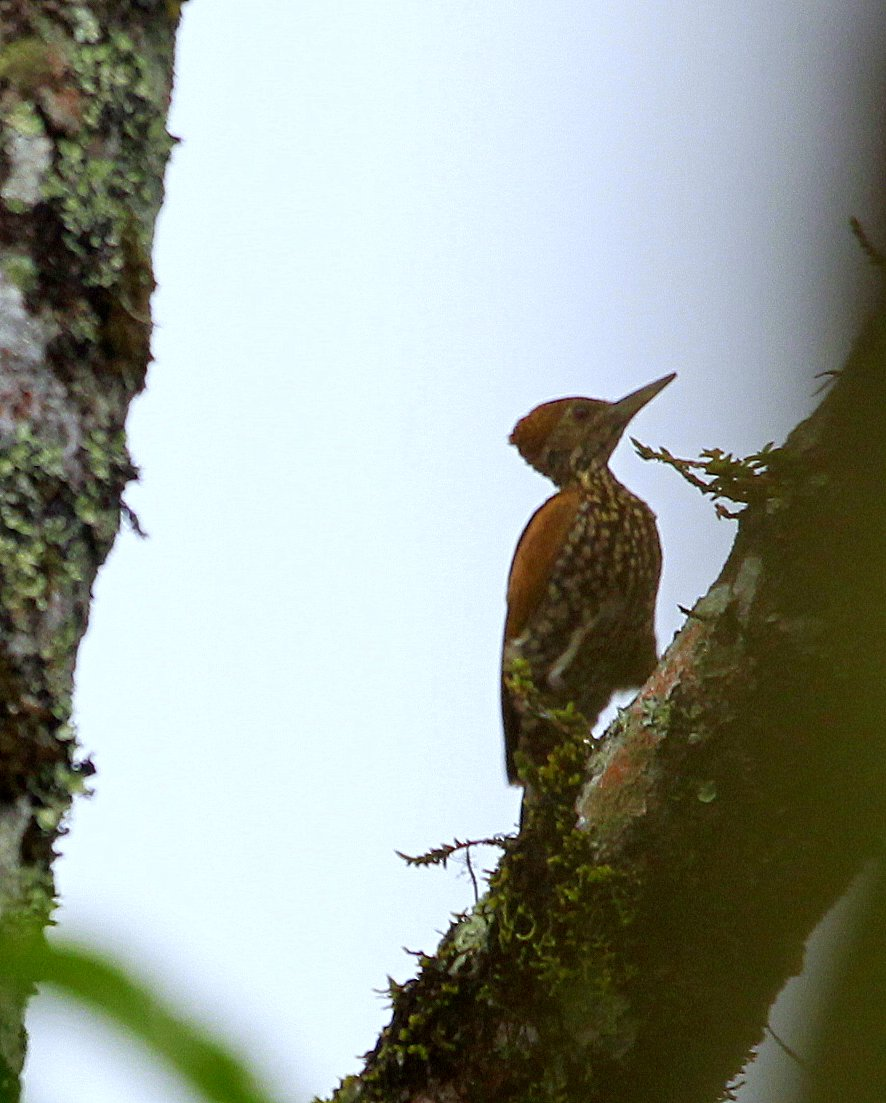
- ssp. montanus

Conservation status
- Least Concern (IUCN 3.1)

Scientific classification
- Kingdom: Animalia
- Phylum: Chordata
- Class: Aves
- Order: Piciformes
- Family: Picidae
- Genus: Chrysocolaptes
- Species: C. lucidus

Binomial name
- Chrysocolaptes lucidus (Scopoli, 1786)

= Buff-spotted flameback =

Species of bird

The buff-spotted flameback (Chrysocolaptes lucidus) is a species of bird in the family Picidae. It is found on the Philippine islands of Bohol, Leyte, Samar, Biliran, Panaon, Mindanao, Basilan, and Samal. Along with the other Philippine species, Yellow-faced flameback, Luzon flameback, Red-headed flameback, it was formerly conspecific greater flameback

== Taxonomy ==
This species is part of the Greater flameback species complex which has now been split into 8 distinct species. This species differs from its most closely related Luzon flameback as females have dirty crowns in females, a heavily spotted throat and belly.

=== Subspecies ===
Three subspecies are recognized:

- C.l. lucidus – Found on Zamboanga Peninsula and Basilan; Red back
- C.l. montanus –Found on Samal island and Mindanao except Zamboanga Peninsula; Pale gold back and slightly smaller
- C.l. rufopunctatus – Found on Bohol, Leyte and Samar; Red face and darker red back

== Ecology and behavior ==
Presumably feeds on insects and wood boring larvae. Typically seen in pairs or family parties and may sometimes associate with White-bellied woodpecker and Southern sooty woodpecker.

Buff-spotted flamebacks, like other woodpeckers, drum—meaning rapidly tap their beak against objects such as dead trees—to attract mates. This species has one of the longest drums, averaging about 51 beats per drum.

Nests in tree cavities. Breeding is believed to occur from January to May. The very similar Greater flameback lays 2 to 5 eggs which incubate in 2 weeks and fledge within a month.

== Habitat and conservation status ==
It is found in tropical moist lowland forest with dense understory up to 1,500 meters above sea level

IUCN has assessed this bird as least-concern species but the population is decreasing. This species' main threat is habitat loss with wholesale clearance of forest habitats as a result of logging, agricultural conversion and mining activities occurring within the range. The most affected part of its range is Bohol which only has 4% forest cover remaining.

Occurs in a few protected areas like Pasonanca Natural Park, Mount Apo and Mount Kitanglad on Mindanao, Rajah Sikatuna Protected Landscape in Bohol and Samar Island Natural Park but actual protection and enforcement from illegal logging and hunting are lax.
