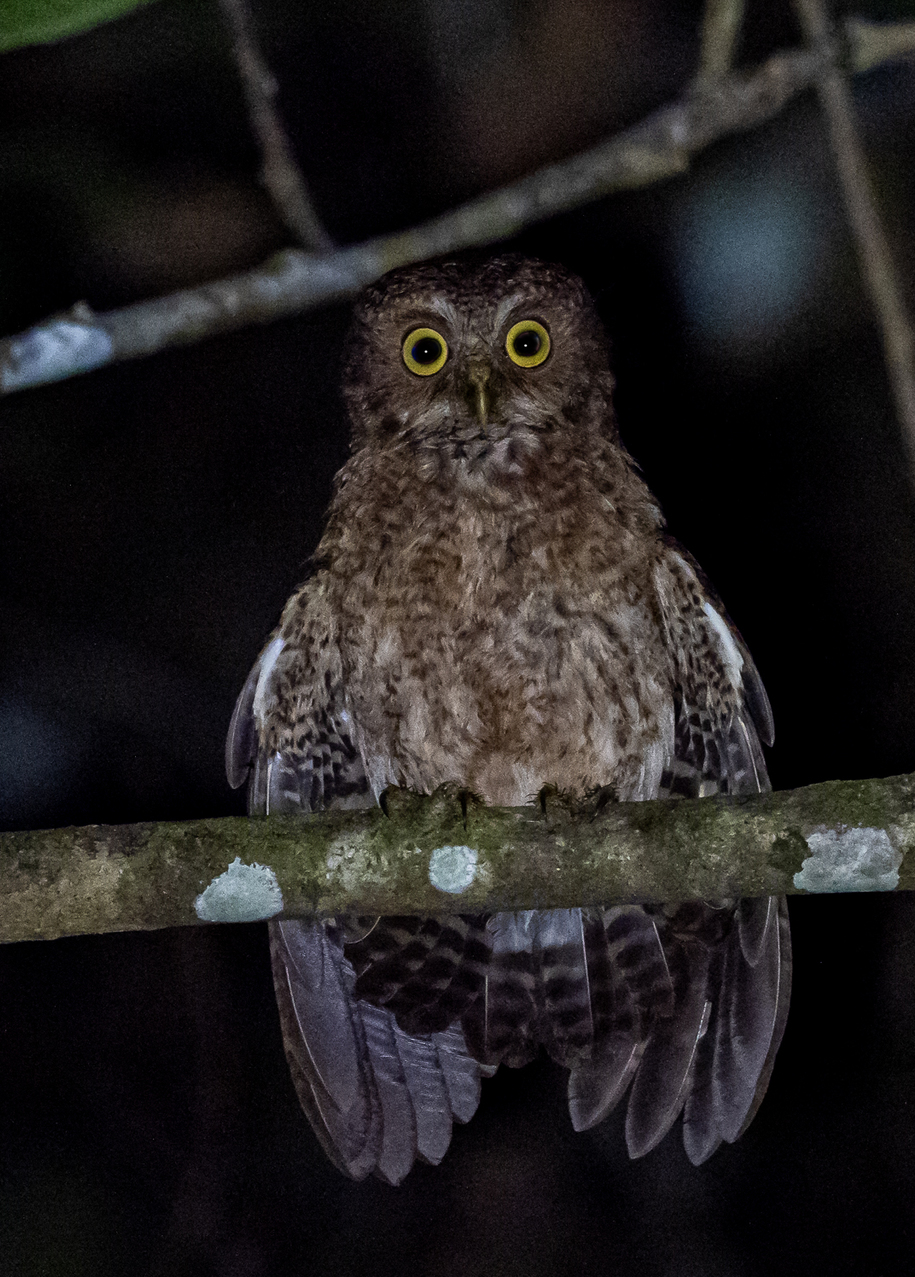

Conservation status
- Vulnerable (IUCN 3.1)
- CITES Appendix II

Scientific classification
- Kingdom: Animalia
- Phylum: Chordata
- Class: Aves
- Order: Strigiformes
- Family: Strigidae
- Genus: Ninox
- Species complex: Philippine hawk-owl species complex
- Species: N. mindorensis

Binomial name
- Ninox mindorensis Ogilvie-Grant, 1896
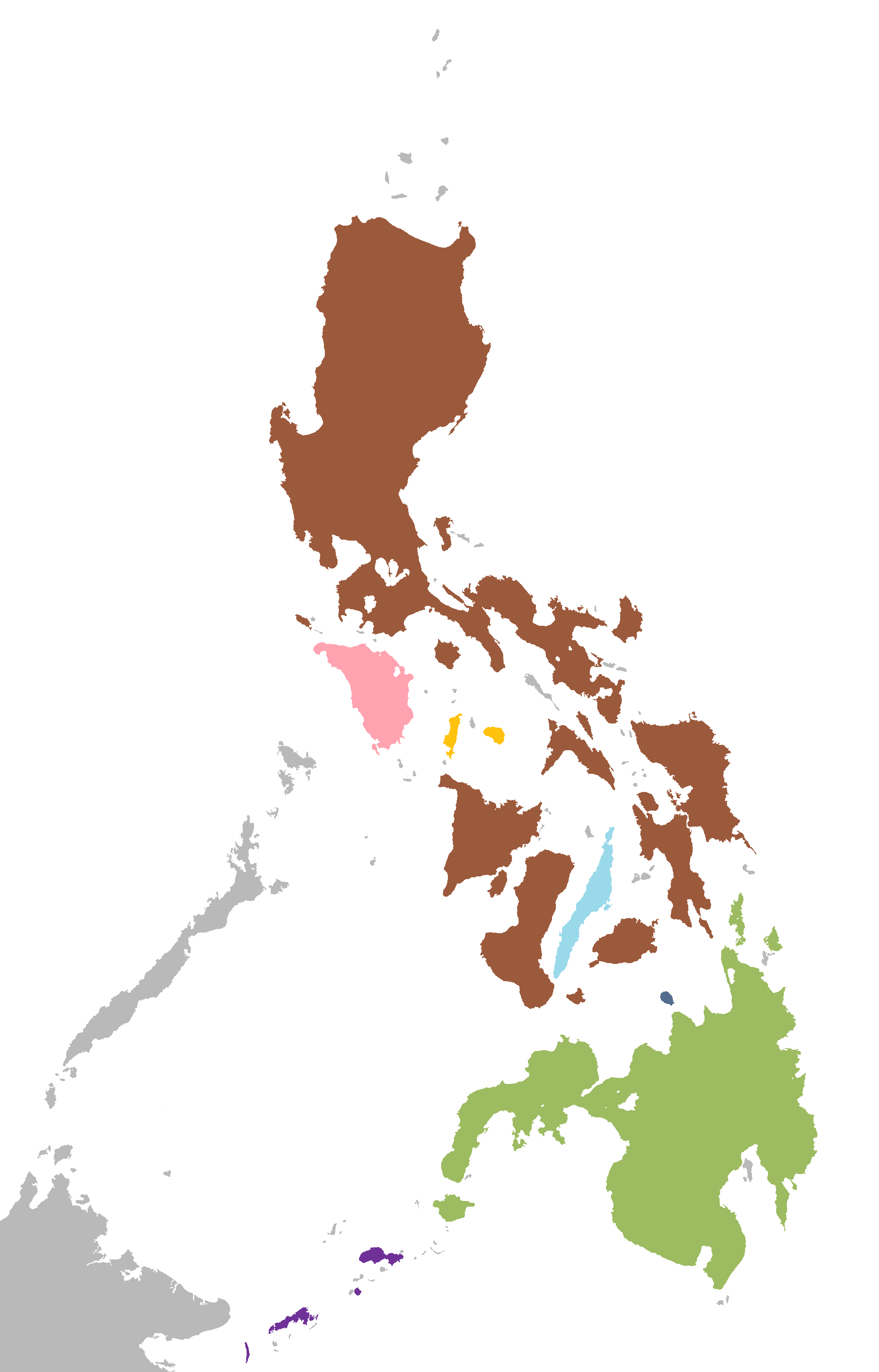
- *Pink: Mindoro Hawk Owl N. mindorensis

= Mindoro boobook =

Species of owl

The Mindoro boobook or Mindoro hawk-owl (Ninox mindorensis) is a species of owl in the family Strigidae that is endemic to the Philippines found in the island of Mindoro. Its habitat is the tropical lowland rainforests. It is threatened and declining due to deforestation.

== Description and taxonomy ==
The Romblon boobook is a medium sized owl found in the forests of Mindoro. It is predominantly dark brown on its head and cback and has a lighter reddish brown color on its chest and sometimes has white vertical streaking. Its wings are mottled brown with a white scapular. It has very fine barring on its mantle, chest and vent. It has dull olive-yellow eyes. The Mindoro boobook is an earless species. The males and females look much alike.

Its call is described as a long series of mournful whistles that end in a screech.

Along with the Camiguin boobook, Romblon boobook, Cebu boobook,Luzon boobook and Mindanao boobook, it was once part of the Philippine hawk-owl species complex but these species were split in 2012 due to physical and vocal differences. Among the complex, it is distinguished by the fine barring on its head and belly and its overall darker plumage.

It is medium-sized at 20cm tall, along with the Sulu boobook, in the Philippine hawk-owl species complex. This is in between the larger Camiguin boobook, Romblon boobook and Cebu boobook at 25cm and the smaller Luzon boobook and Mindanao boobook which are 15 to 18cm tall.

== Ecology and behaviour ==
This species ecology has yet to be properly studied but it is pressumed to have a typical boobook diet of insects, small mammals, reptiles, amphibians and possibly even birds. Nothing is known about its breeding habits but is presumed to nest in tree cavities like other boobooks.

== Habitat and conservation status ==
Its habitat is in tropical moist lowland primary and secondary forests up to 1250 meters above sea level. It is also occasionally seen on forest edges, clearings and plantations.

The IUCN Red List classifies this bird as vulnerable with best estimates of population (as of 2024) as 2,500 to 9,999 mature individuals (range: 2,500 – 25,000). This species' main threat is habitat loss with wholesale clearance of forest habitats as a result of legal and illegal logging, mining, conversion into farmlands and urbanization. In 1988, just 120 km^{2} of forest remained on Mindoro, of which only 25% was closed-canopy.

It occurs in a few protected areas in Mounts Iglit-Baco National Park (which is also the stronghold of the critically endangered Tamaraw) and Naujan Lake National Park.

There is no species-specific conservation program at present, but conservation actions proposed include more species surveys to better understand habitat and population, initiating education and awareness campaigns to raise the species' profile and instill pride in locals, and lobbying for protection of the remaining forest.
