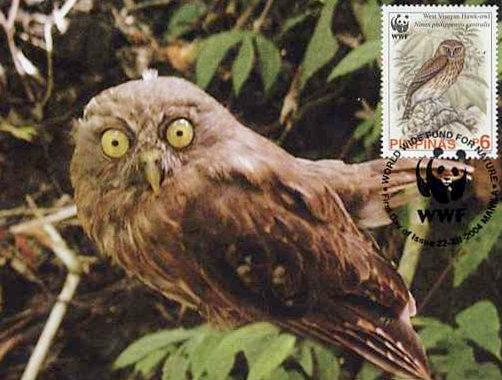
- Postal card for Ninox philippensis centralis

Scientific classification
- Domain: Eukaryota
- Kingdom: Animalia
- Phylum: Chordata
- Class: Aves
- Order: Strigiformes
- Family: Strigidae
- Genus: Ninox
- Species complex: Philippine hawk-owl species complex
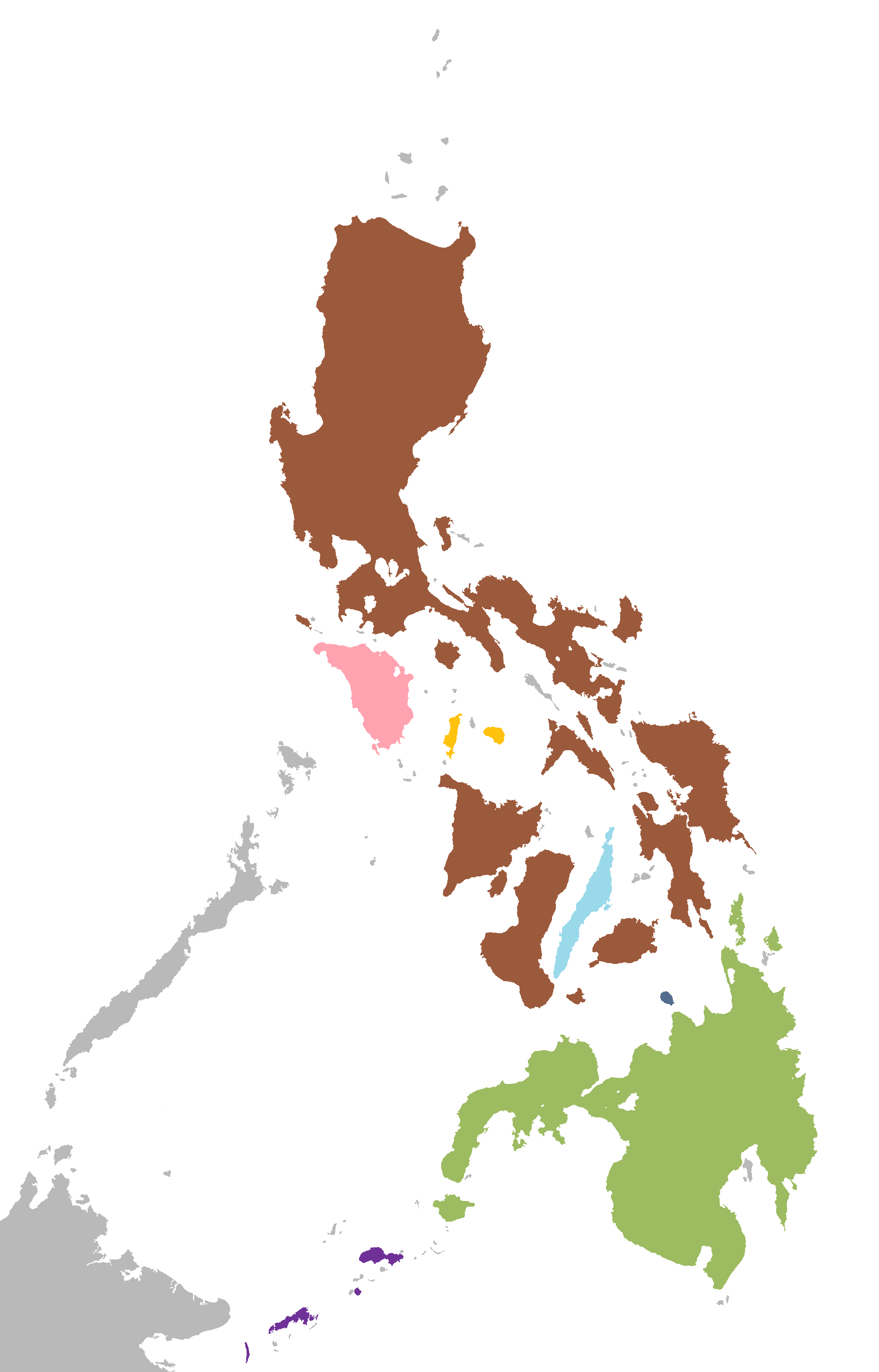
- *Brown: Luzon Hawk Owl Ninox philippensis, including N. p. ticaoensis and N. p. centralis: Green: Mindanao Hawk Owl N. spilocephala; Pink: Mindoro Hawk Owl N. mindorensis; Gold: Romblon Hawk Owl N. spilonota including N. s. fisheri; Pale Blue: Cebu Hawk Owl N. rumseyi; Dark Blue: Camiguin Hawk Owl N. leventisi; Purple: Sulu Hawk Owl N. reyi

Synonyms
- Ninox philippensis complex

= Philippine hawk-owl =

Species of bird

The Philippine hawk-owl is a species complex of owls in the genus Ninox. They are all endemic to the Philippines.

== Systematics and taxonomy ==
There are seven known species:

- Luzon boobook (Ninox philippensis)
  - Ninox philippensis centralis – Bohol, Boracay, Carabao, Guimaras, Negros, Panay, Semirara and Siquijor
  - Ninox philippensis philippensis – Biliran, Buad, Catanduanes, Leyte, Luzon, Marinduque, Polillo and Samar
  - Ninox philippensis ticaoensis – Ticao
- Mindoro boobook (Ninox mindorensis) – Mindoro
- Sulu boobook (Ninox reyi) – Bongao, Jolo, Sanga Sanga, Siasi, Sibutu and Tawi-Tawi)
- Mindanao boobook (Ninox spilocephala) (Basilan, Dinagat, Mindanao and Siargao
- Romblon boobook (Ninox spilonotus)
  - Ninox spilonotus spilonotus – Sibuyan
  - Ninox spilonotus fischeri – Tablas
- Cebu boobook (Ninox rumseyi) – Cebu
- Camiguin boobook (Ninox leventisi) – Camiguin.

== Ecology ==
Natural habitats are subtropical or tropical moist lowland forest and subtropical or tropical moist montane forest.
