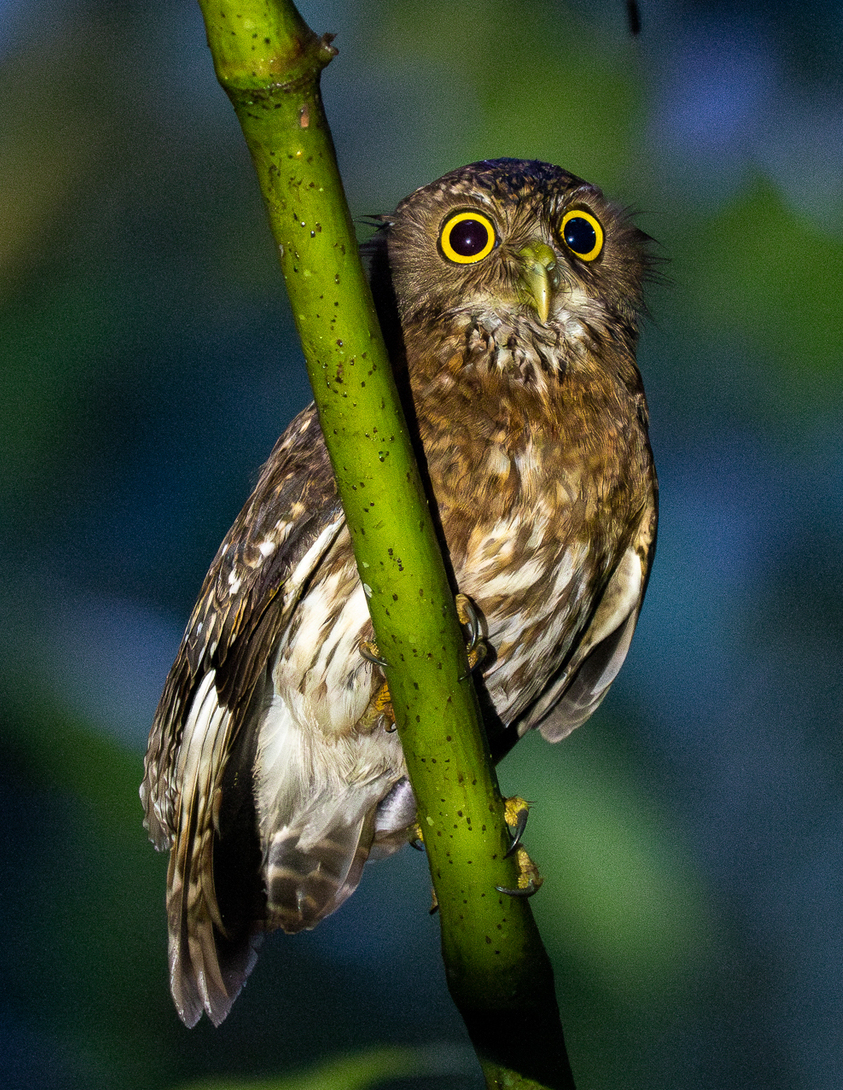

Conservation status
- Near Threatened (IUCN 3.1)
- CITES Appendix II

Scientific classification
- Kingdom: Animalia
- Phylum: Chordata
- Class: Aves
- Order: Strigiformes
- Family: Strigidae
- Genus: Ninox
- Species complex: Philippine hawk-owl species complex
- Species: N. spilocephala

Binomial name
- Ninox spilocephala Tweeddale, 1879
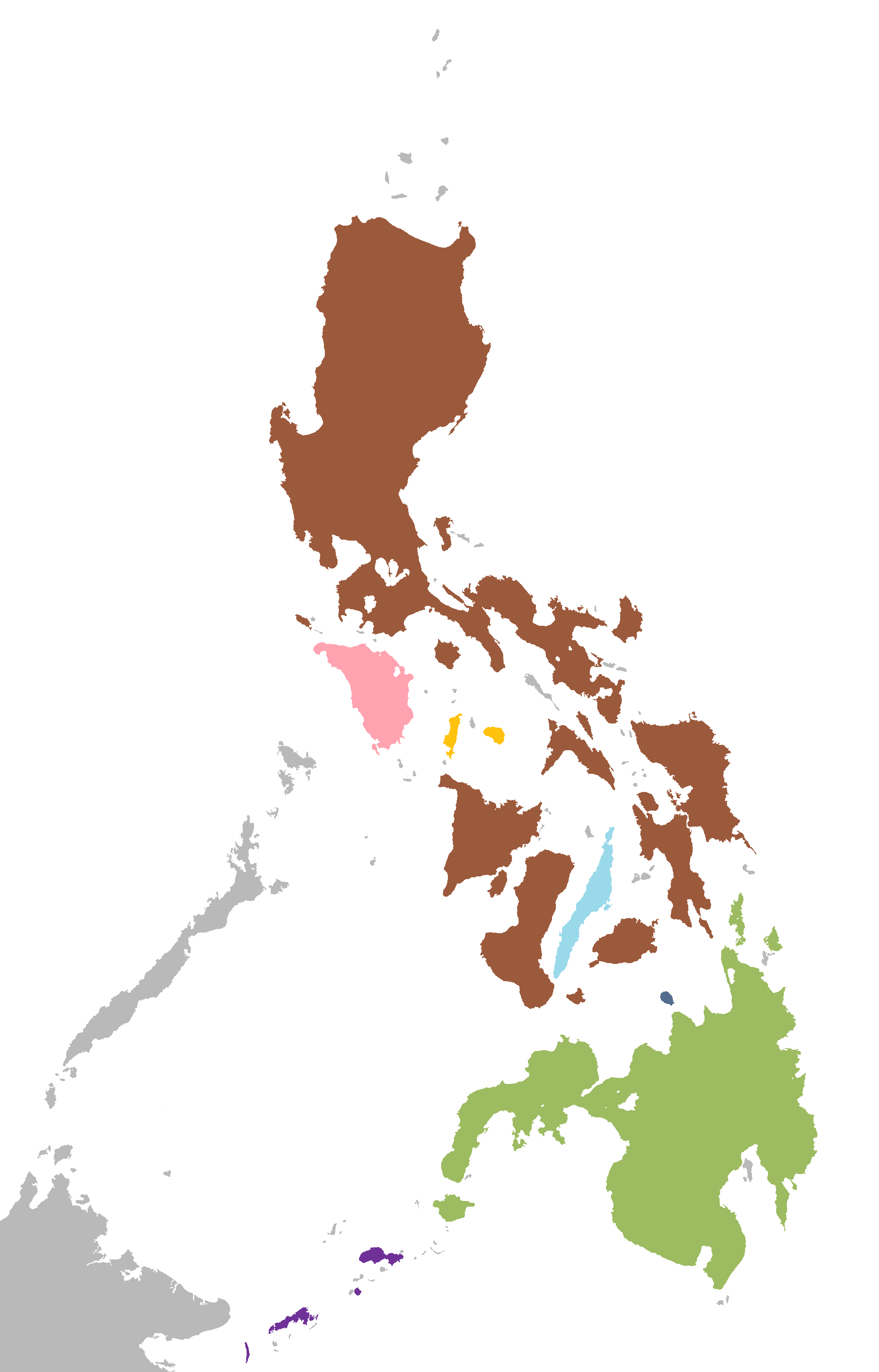
- Green: Mindanao Hawk Owl N. spilocephala

= Mindanao boobook =

Species of owl

The Mindanao boobook or Mindanao hawk-owl (Ninox spilocephala) is a species of owl in the family Strigidae that is endemic to the Philippines on the island of Mindanao. It was previously known as a subspecies of the Philippine hawk-owl, but was reclassified in 2012, as voice and other evidence suggested it a distinct species. It is found in tropical moist lowland forest. It is threatened by habitat loss.

== Description and taxonomy ==
The Mindanao boobook is an earless species. The males and females look much alike.

Among the species complex, this owl is differentiated by its call which sounds closer to a dove than the typical screeching of the boobooks. It also has smaller size and mottled dark and light rufous brown streaking on its breast and whitish belly.

It, along with the even smaller Luzon boobook, are among the smallest in the Philippine hawk-owl species complex, at 18cm. This is smaller than the Mindoro boobook and Sulu boobook which are 20cm tall. These species are dwarfed by the much larger Camiguin boobook, Romblon boobook and Cebu boobook at 25cm tall.

== Ecology and behaviour ==
It primarily feeds on insects but like other boobooks assumed to also feed on small mammals, reptiles, amphibians and possibly even birds. Not much is known about its breeding habits. Nestling was found in march.

== Habitat and conservation status ==
Its habitat is in tropical moist lowland primary forest.

The IUCN Red List classifies this bird as near-threatened with population believed to be declining. This species' main threat is habitat loss with wholesale clearance of forest habitats as a result of legal and illegal logging, mining, conversion into farmlands and plantations and urbanization. Its entire range has suffered extensive lowland deforestation. In 1988, forest cover had been reduced to an estimated 29% on Mindanao, most of it above 1,000 m

There are no species specific conservation programs going on at the moment but conservation actions proposed include more species surveys to better understand habitat and population. initiate education and awareness campaigns to raise the species's profile and instill pride in locals. Lobby for protection of remaining forest.
