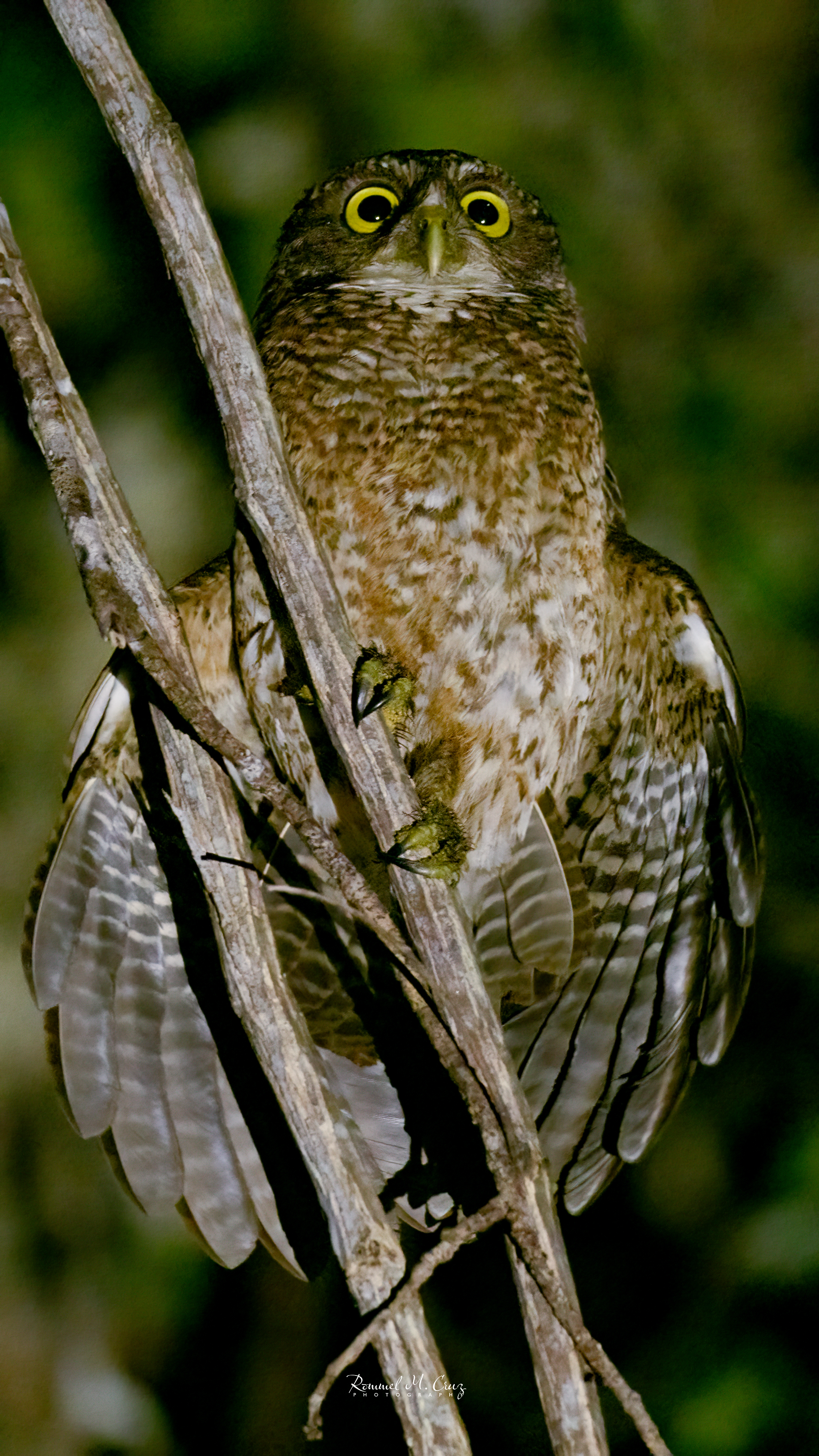

Conservation status
- Vulnerable (IUCN 3.1)
- CITES Appendix II

Scientific classification
- Kingdom: Animalia
- Phylum: Chordata
- Class: Aves
- Order: Strigiformes
- Family: Strigidae
- Genus: Ninox
- Species complex: Philippine hawk-owl species complex
- Species: N. reyi

Binomial name
- Ninox reyi Oustalet, 1880
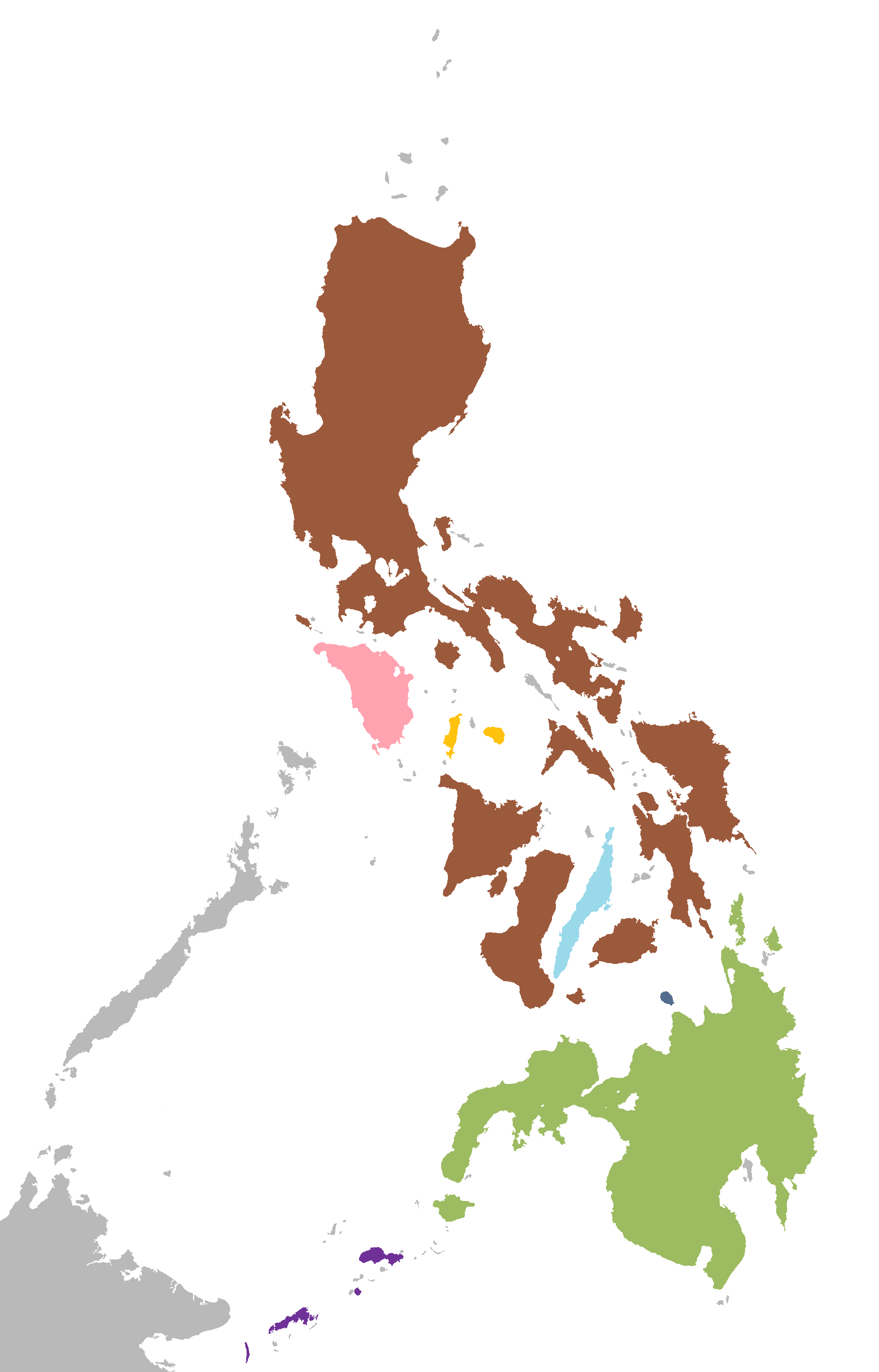
- Purple: Sulu Hawk Owl N. reyi

= Sulu boobook =

Species of owl

The Sulu boobook or Sulu hawk-owl (Ninox reyi) is a species of owl in the family Strigidae. It is endemic to the Sulu Archipelago in the Philippines. It was previously known as a subspecies of the Philippine hawk-owl, but was reclassified in 2012, as voice and other evidence suggested it was a distinct species. It is found in tropical moist lowland forest. It is threatened by habitat loss.

== Description and taxonomy ==
The Sulu boobook is a small sized owl found in the forests of Sulu Archipelago. It is uniformly barred with brown upperparts and head and orange brown underparts. It has white speckling on the wing and a buff white throat patch. Eyes are bright yellow.

Along with the Camiguin boobook, Romblon boobook, Cebu boobook,Luzon boobook, Mindoro boobook and Mindanao boobook, it was once part of the Philippine hawk-owl species complex but these species were split in 2012 due to physical and vocal differences.

Among the species complex, this owl is unique with its call of a series of clucks rather than the typical screeching of the other Philippine hawk-owls in the species complex. It is distinguished by the heavy barring on its head and belly, white throat-patch and facial disk.

It is medium-sized at 20cm tall, along with the Mindoro boobook within Philippine hawk-owl species complex. This is in between the larger Camiguin boobook, Romblon boobook and Cebu boobook at 25cm and the smaller Luzon boobook and Mindanao boobook, which are 15 to 18cm tall.

This species is monotypic and has no subspecies although the race found on Siasi was once proposed as the subsepcies everetti although this has since been synonymized.

== Habitat and conservation status ==
Its habitat is in tropical moist lowland primary and secondary forests up to 700 meters above sea level. It is also occasionally seen on forest edge, clearings and plantations. On Tawi-Tawi, the species is also found in mature mangroves and large trees in the vicinity of villages

The IUCN Red List classifies this bird as vulnerable with population estimates of 2,500 to 7,500 mature individuals as of 2025. This species' main threat is habitat loss with wholesale clearance of forest habitats as a result of legal and illegal logging, mining, conversion into farmlands or palm oil plantations and urbanization. Due to the rapid loss of habitat in the Sulu Archipelago, many of the birds endemic to the region like the Sulu hornbill, Tawitawi brown dove, blue-winged racket-tail and the Sulu pygmy woodpecker are threatened with extinction.

There is no species-specific conservation program at present.
