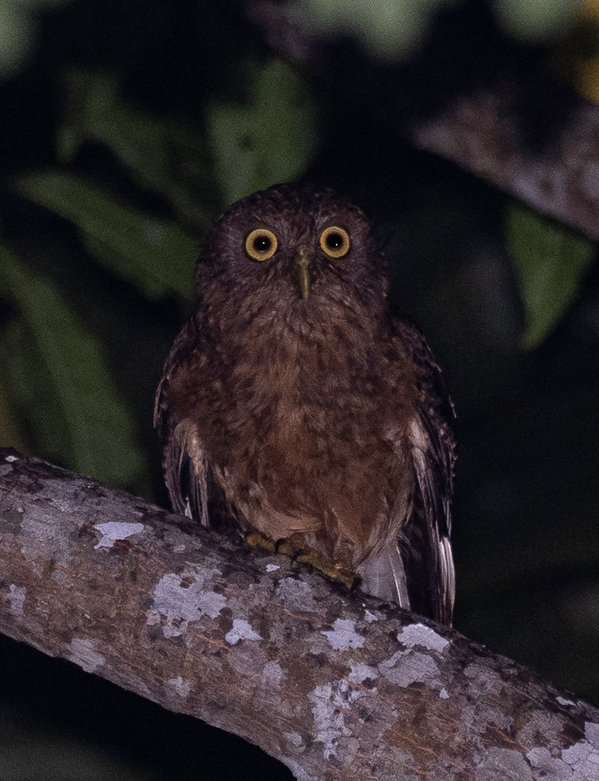

Conservation status
- Endangered (IUCN 3.1)
- CITES Appendix II

Scientific classification
- Kingdom: Animalia
- Phylum: Chordata
- Class: Aves
- Order: Strigiformes
- Family: Strigidae
- Genus: Ninox
- Species complex: Philippine hawk-owl species complex
- Species: N. spilonotus

Binomial name
- Ninox spilonotus Bourns & Worcester, 1894
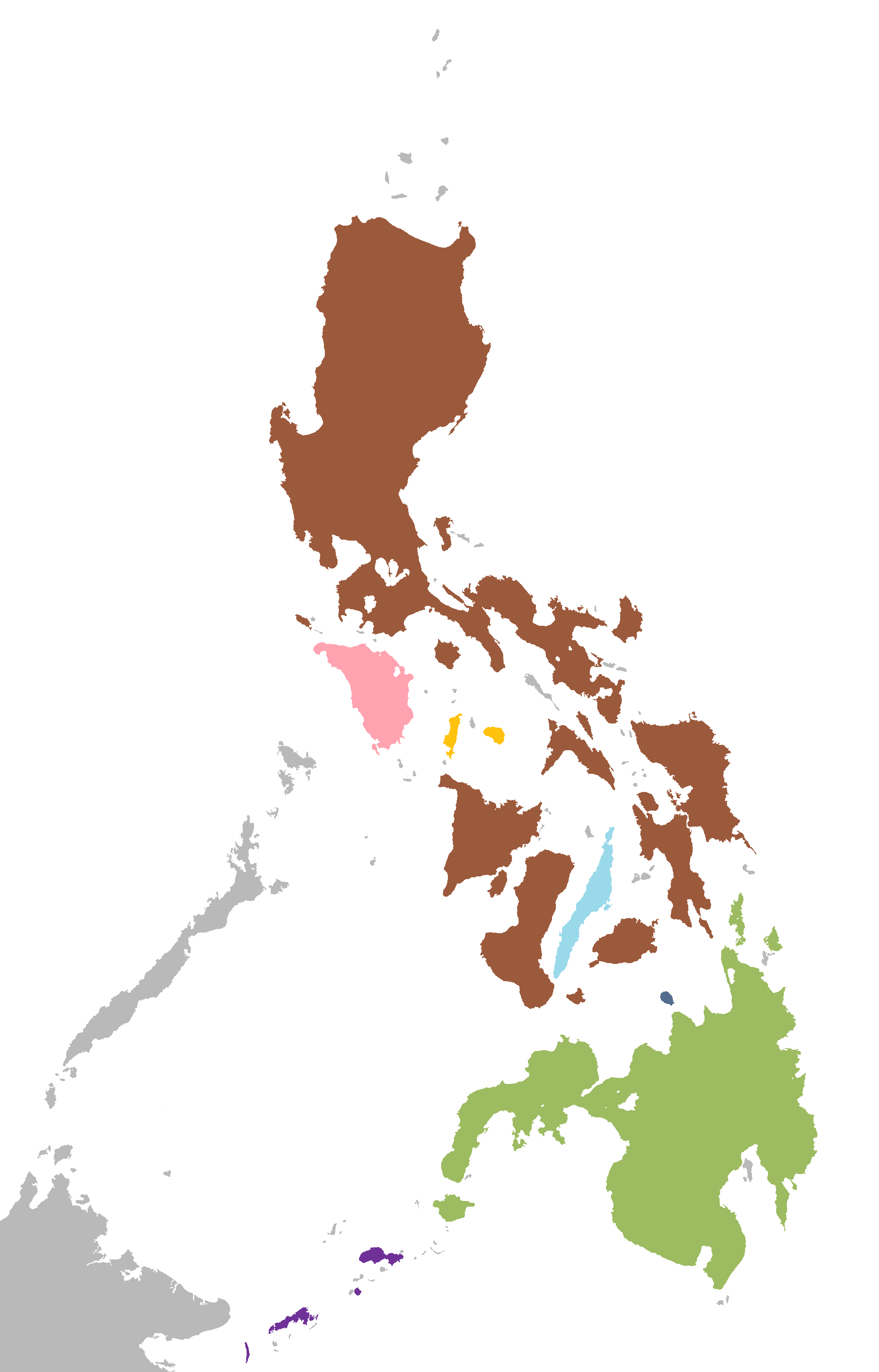
- Gold: Romblon Hawk Owl N. spilonota including N. s. fisheri

= Romblon boobook =

Species of owl

The Romblon boobook or Romblon hawk-owl (Ninox spilonotus), is a species of owl in the family Strigidae that is endemic to the Philippines. It is only found on the islands of Tablas, Sibuyan and Romblon. It was previously known as a subspecies of the Philippine hawk-owl, but was reclassified in 2012, as voice and other evidence suggested it was a distinct species. Its natural habitat is tropical moist lowland forest. It is threatened by habitat loss.

== Description and taxonomy ==
The Romblon boobook is a medium sized owl found in the forests of Romblon, Tablas and Sibuyan. It is predominantly brown without any strong markings. It has long whiskers on its face and bright yellow eyes. It is an earless species. The males and females are similar in appearance.

Along with the Camiguin boobook and Cebu boobook, it is the largest in the Philippine hawk-owl species complex reaching 25 cm tall versus the much smaller Luzon boobook, Mindanao boobook, Mindoro boobook and Sulu boobook, which range in size from 15 to 20 cm tall.

=== Subspecies ===
Two subspecies are recognized:

- Ninox spilonotus spilonotus (Sibuyan) – Larger, with a more hiss-like call
- Ninox spilonotus fischeri (Tablas) – Smaller, with a raspy call

== Ecology and behaviour ==
This species ecology has yet to be properly studied but it is presumed to have a typical boobook diet of insects, small mammals, reptiles, amphibians and possibly even birds.

Nothing is known about its breeding habits aside from that this species mates around February, nesting in hollow trees..

== Habitat and conservation status ==
Its natural habitats are subtropical or tropical moist lowland primary forest and secondary forests up to an altitude of 1000 metres above sea level.

The IUCN Red List classifies this bird as an endangered species with population estimates of 250 to 999 mature individuals. This species' main threat is habitat loss with wholesale clearance of forest habitats as a result of legal and illegal logging, mining and conversion into farmlands through slash-and-burn and urbanization.

This species occurs in protected areas such as Mount Guiting-Guiting but protection is lax and logging still supposedly occurs. Mt Palaupau serves as a watershed for Tablas Island.

There is no species-specific conservation program at present.
