= Camiguin boobook =

Camiguin hawk-owl

Conservation status
- Vulnerable (IUCN 3.1)
- CITES Appendix II

Scientific classification
- Kingdom: Animalia
- Phylum: Chordata
- Class: Aves
- Order: Strigiformes
- Family: Strigidae
- Genus: Ninox
- Species complex: Philippine hawk-owl species complex
- Species: N. leventisi

Binomial name
- Ninox leventisi Rasmussen, Allen, D, Collar, Hutchinson, Jakosalem, Kennedy, RS, Lambert & Paguntalan, 2012
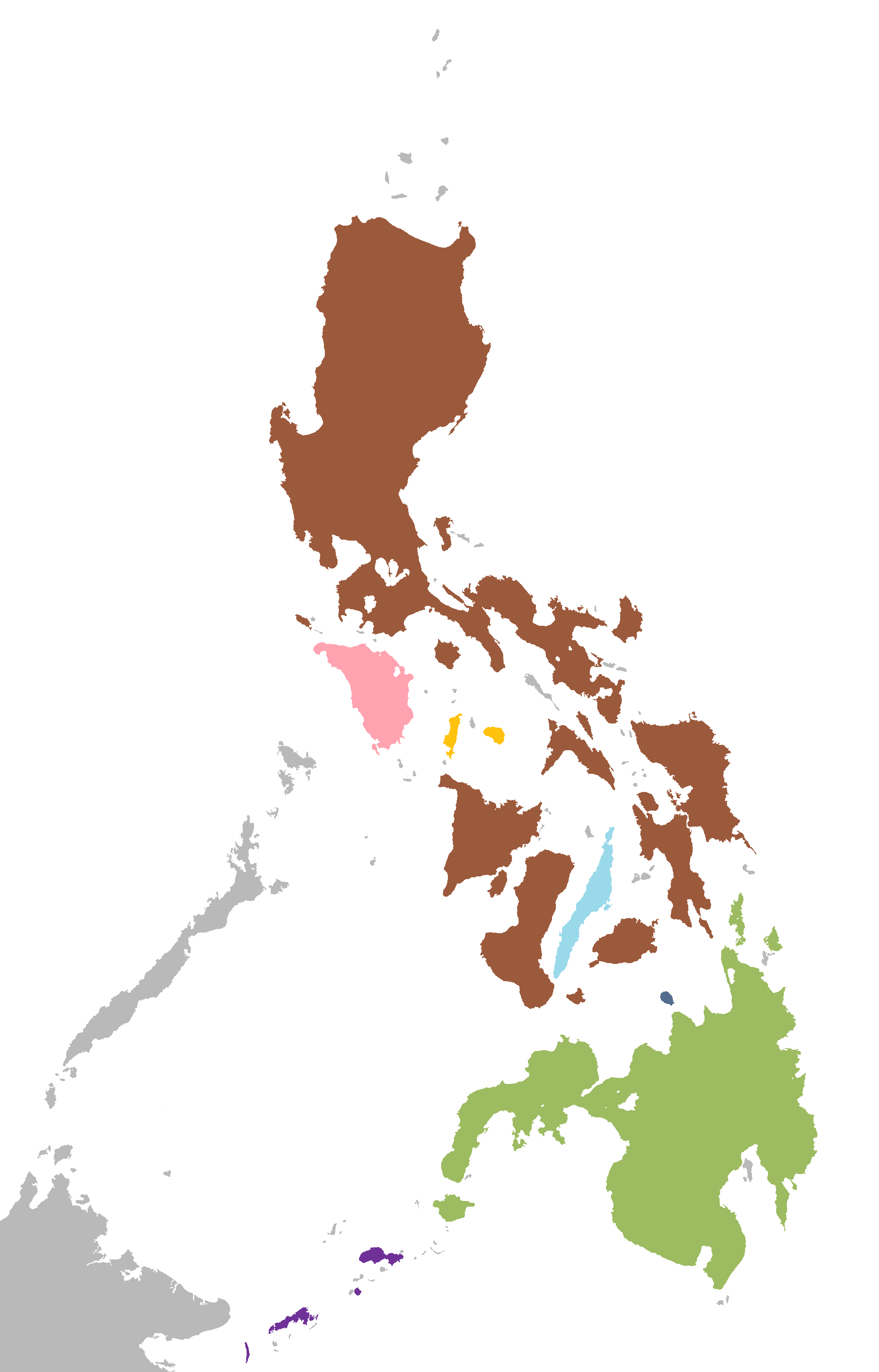
- *Dark Blue: Camiguin Hawk Owl N. leventisi

Species of owl

The Camiguin boobook or Camiguin hawk-owl (Ninox leventisi) is an owl species resident to the Camiguin island in the Philippines. It is the only owl in the country with greenish-yellow or grayish eyes. It was previously known as a subspecies of the Philippine hawk-owl, but was reclassified in 2012, as voice and other evidence suggested it a distinct species. Its native name is kugkug

== Description ==
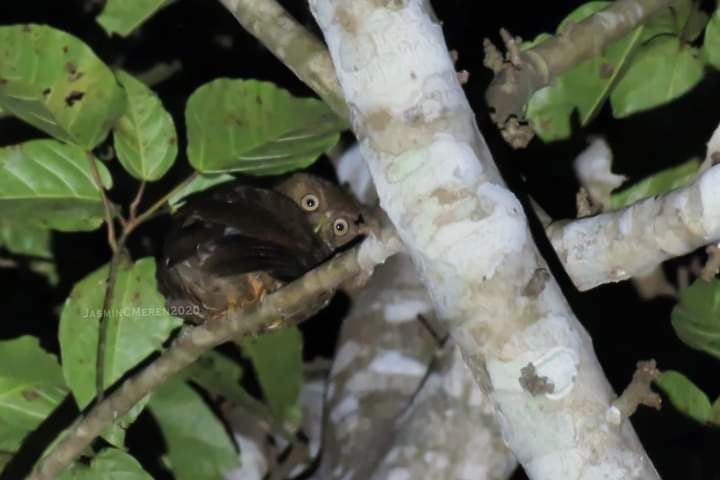

Among the species complex, this owl is unique in that its eyes are striking greenish-yellow versus the standard yellow or reddish-brown eyes of the rest of its related species.

Along with the Romblon boobook and Cebu boobook, it is the largest in the Philippine hawk-owl species complex reaching sizes of 25cm tall versus the much smaller Luzon boobook, Mindanao boobook, Mindoro boobook and Sulu boobook, which range in size from 15 to 20cm tall.

== Ecology and behaviour ==
This species ecology has yet to be properly studied but it is pressumed to have a typical boobook diet of insects, small mammals, reptiles, amphibians and possibly even birds. Nothing is known about its breeding habits but is presumed to nest in tree cavities like other boobooks.

== Habitat and conservation status ==
Its habitat is in tropical moist lowland primary and secondary forests up to 700 meters above sea level. It is also occasionally seen on forest edge, clearings and plantations.

The IUCN Red List classifies this bird as vulnerable with population estimates of 250 to 999 mature individuals. This species' main threat is habitat loss with wholesale clearance of forest habitats as a result of legal and illegal logging, mining and conversion into farmlands through Slash-and-burn and urbanization mostly due to an influx of tourists which have forced these birds to the uplands.

There are no species specific conservation programs going on at the moment but conservation actions proposed include more species surveys to better understand habitat and population. initiate education and awareness campaigns to raise the species's profile and instill pride in locals. Lobby for protection of remaining forest.
