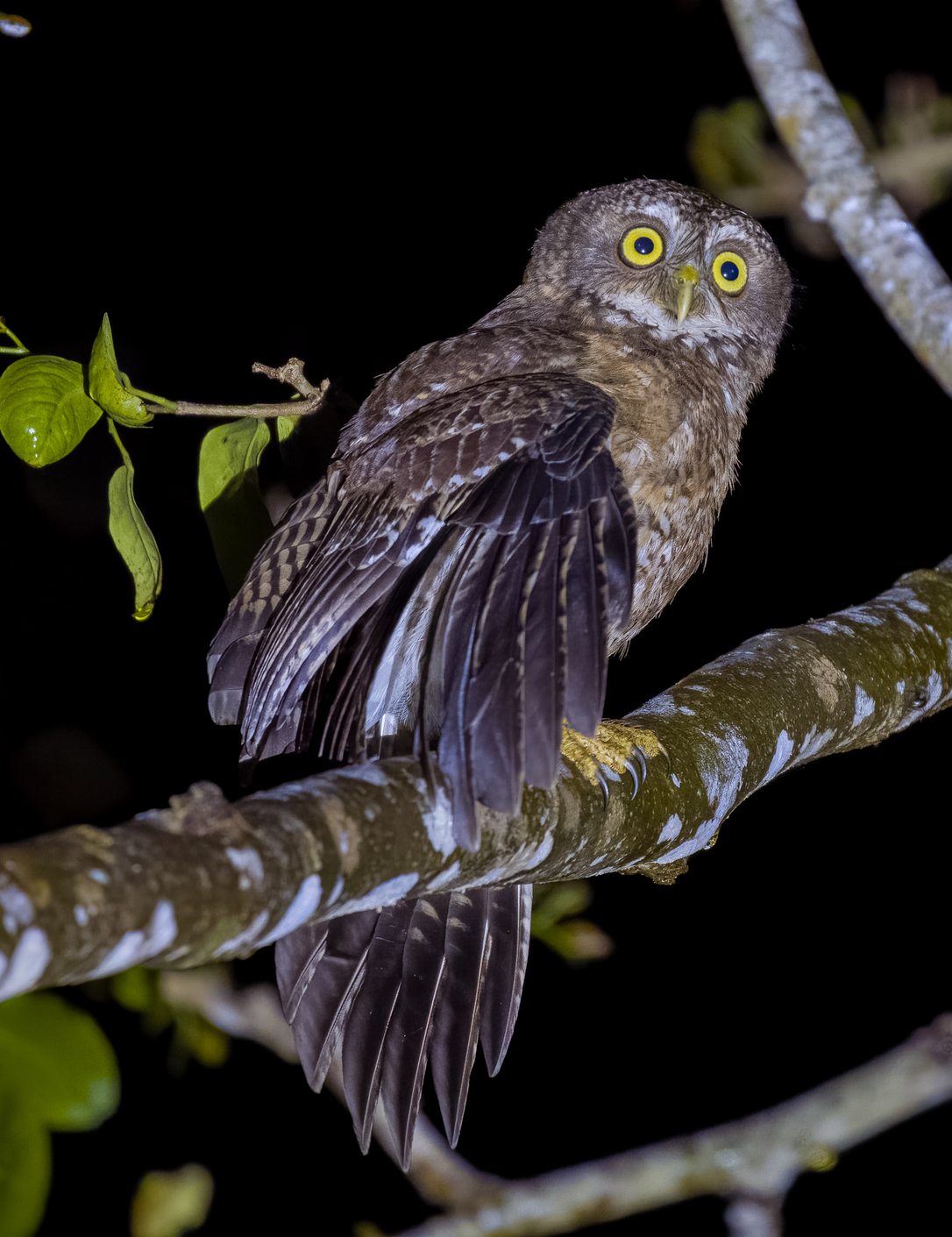

Conservation status
- Vulnerable (IUCN 3.1)
- CITES Appendix II

Scientific classification
- Kingdom: Animalia
- Phylum: Chordata
- Class: Aves
- Order: Strigiformes
- Family: Strigidae
- Genus: Ninox
- Species complex: Philippine hawk-owl species complex
- Species: N. rumseyi

Binomial name
- Ninox rumseyi Rasmussen, Allen, D, Collar, Hutchinson, Jakosalem, Kennedy, RS, Lambert & Paguntalan, 2012
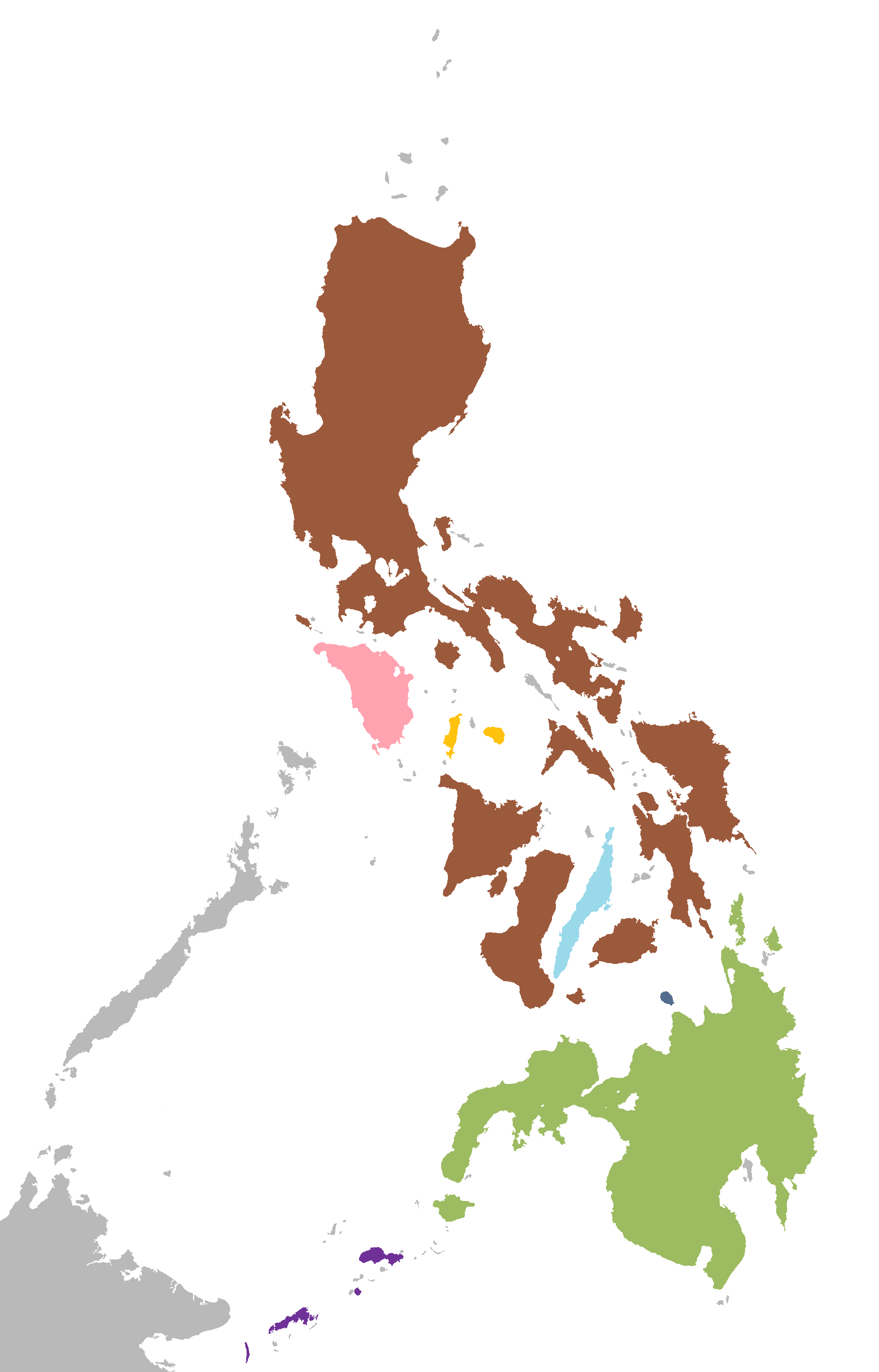
- Pale Blue: Cebu Hawk Owl N. rumseyi

= Cebu boobook =

Species of owl

The Cebu boobook or Cebu hawk-owl (Ninox rumseyi) is a species of owl in the family Strigidae. It is endemic to the Philippines found in the remnant forests of Cebu. It was formerly considered a subspecies of the Philippine hawk-owl, but was reclassified in 2012, as voice and other data suggested placement in a distinct species. It is threatened by habitat loss as Cebu is the most deforested among major Philippine islands with just 0.03% of original forest remaining.

== Description and taxonomy ==
This is a medium sized owls found in the forests of Cebu. It is primarily brown but has white speckling on the wings, a pale bar on the shoulder and a white throat patch and eyebrows. The Cebu boobook is an earless species and has a round head. Males and females exhibit no clear sexual dimorphism and are similar in appearance.

It was formerly considered a subspecies of the Philippine hawk-owl, but was reclassified in 2012, as voice and other data suggested placement in a distinct species.

Along with the Camiguin hawk-owl and Romblon boobook, it is the largest in the Philippine hawk-owl species complex at 25cm tall versus the much smaller Luzon boobook, Mindanao boobook, Mindoro boobook and Sulu boobook, which range in size from 15 to 20cm tall. It is best differentiated from other owls from this complex with its white throat and differences in vocalizations

== Ecology and behaviour ==
This species feeds on a diet of insects, small mammals, reptiles, amphibians and birds. Among Philippine hawk-owls, this species appears to feed more on birds with species such as Elegant tit, Magnificent sunbird, Red-keeled flowerpecker and flycatchers as part of the birds it has recorded to feed on. Nests have been found in May. Each breeding pair is believed to hold territories of 10 hectares. It nests in natural cavities in the trunks of tall trees. Nest contained 2 eggs.

== Habitat and conservation status ==
Its natural habitats are tropical moist lowland primary forest and secondary forests up to an altitude of 700 metres above sea level. It is also seen in clearings and plantations as long as there is nearby forest

The IUCN Red List classifies this bird as vulnerable with population estimates of 250 to 999 mature individuals with the belief that its population is on the lower estimate of that range. This species' main threat is habitat loss with wholesale clearance of forest habitats as a result of legal and illegal logging, mining and conversion into farmlands through slash-and-burn and urbanization. Cebu underwent severe deforestation in the 1890s and now just 0.03% or 15km^{2} forest cover remains. The forests of Cebu continue to undergo hunting pressure and deforestation — further reducing what little there is remaining.

This has led to many other species sharing its range to also be endangered. It also shares a habitat with the Cebu flowerpecker which is one of the most endangered birds in the world and other endangered species such as the black shama and Cebu streak-breasted bulbul. This has led to many extinctions of species such as Cebu warty pig and possibly the Cebu amethyst brown dove and subspecies extinctions of Philippine oriole, blackish cuckooshrike, bar-bellied cuckooshrike, Philippine hanging parrot and more.

The Cebu boobook occurs in the Alcoy, Argao, Dalaguete, Tabunan and Boljoon protected forests, but like all places in the Philippines protection is lax.

There is no species-specific conservation program at present.
