= Grey-throated bulbul =

Grey-throated bulbul may refer to several passerine bird species of the bulbul family, Pycnonotidae:

- Palawan bulbul (Alophoixus frater), found in the Philippines
- Western greenbul (Arizelocichla tephrolaema), found in Africa
