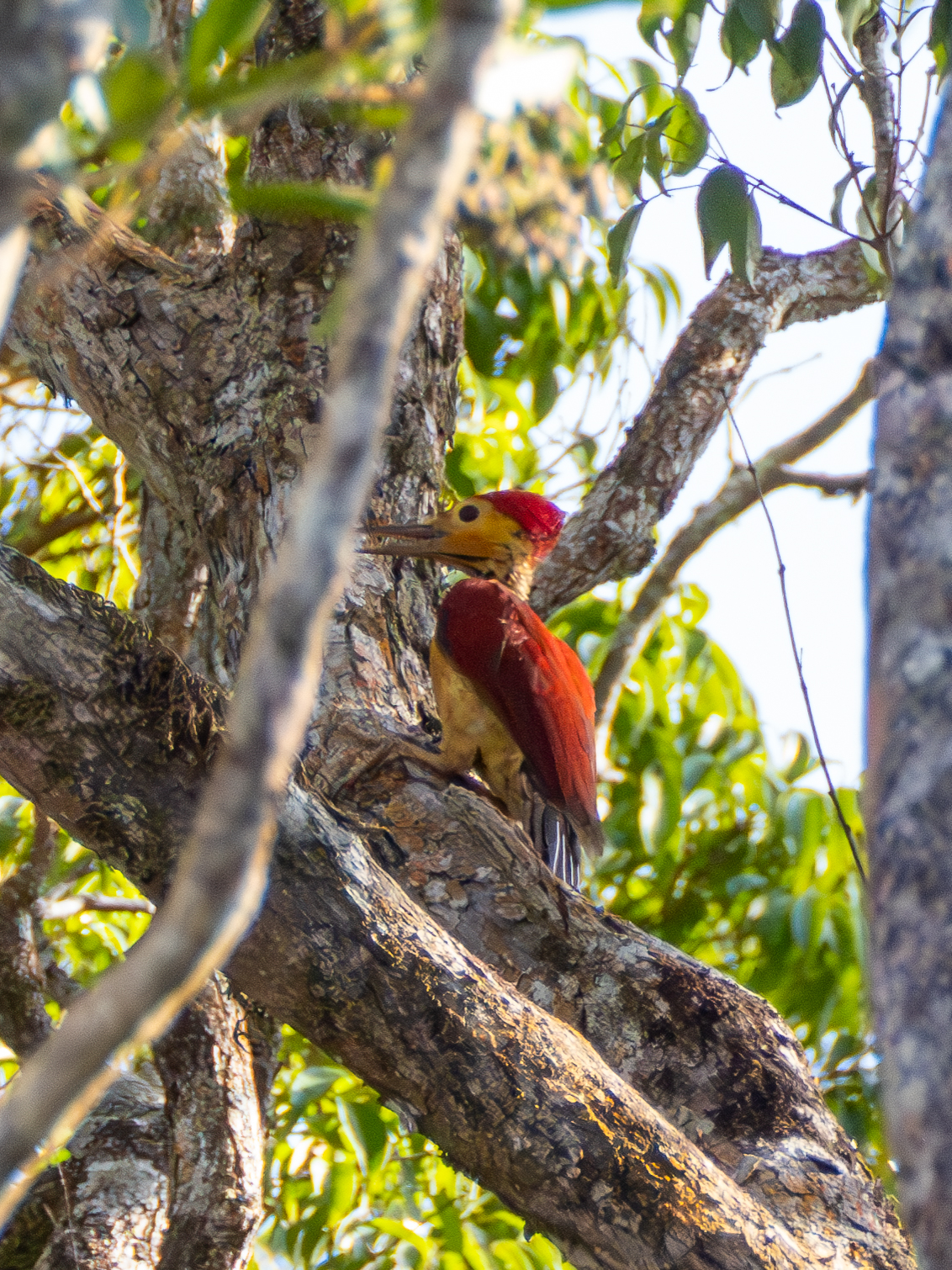
- Male
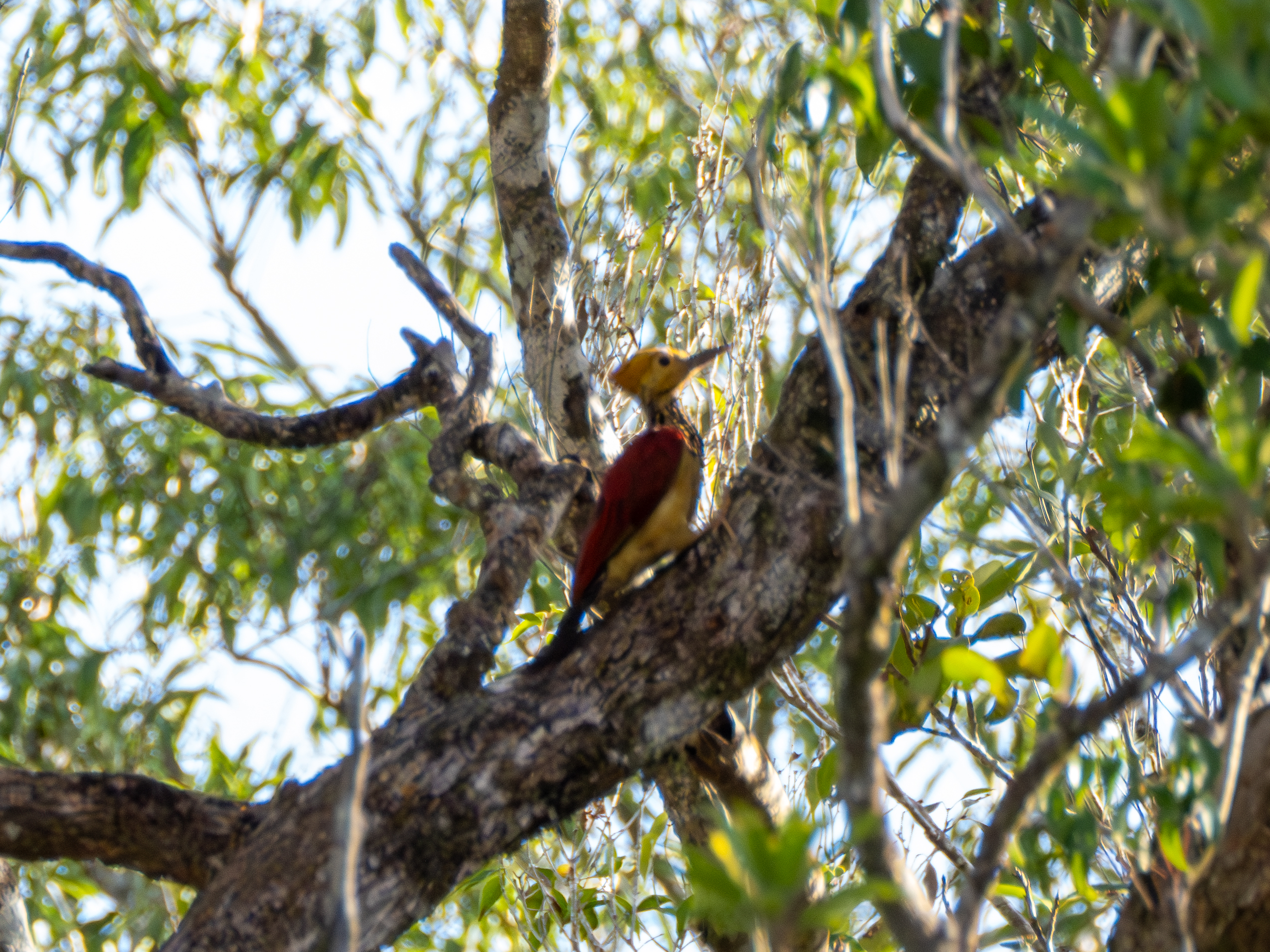
- Female

Conservation status
- Endangered (IUCN 3.1)

Scientific classification
- Kingdom: Animalia
- Phylum: Chordata
- Class: Aves
- Order: Piciformes
- Family: Picidae
- Genus: Chrysocolaptes
- Species: C. xanthocephalus

Binomial name
- Chrysocolaptes xanthocephalus Walden & Layard, 1872

= Yellow-faced flameback =

Species of bird

The yellow-faced flameback (Chrysocolaptes xanthocephalus) is a species of bird in the family Picidae. It is found on the Philippine islands of Negros and Panay. It is extinct on Guimaras, Masbate, and Ticao . It is one of the most spectacular woodpeckers with its bright yellow head and crimson red back. It was previously considered a subspecies of greater flameback but has since been designated full species status. It is found in moist lowland forests including primary, secondary and even plantations and clearings provided there are still standing trees. It is the rarest woodpecker in the country and it is threatened by habitat loss.

== Description ==
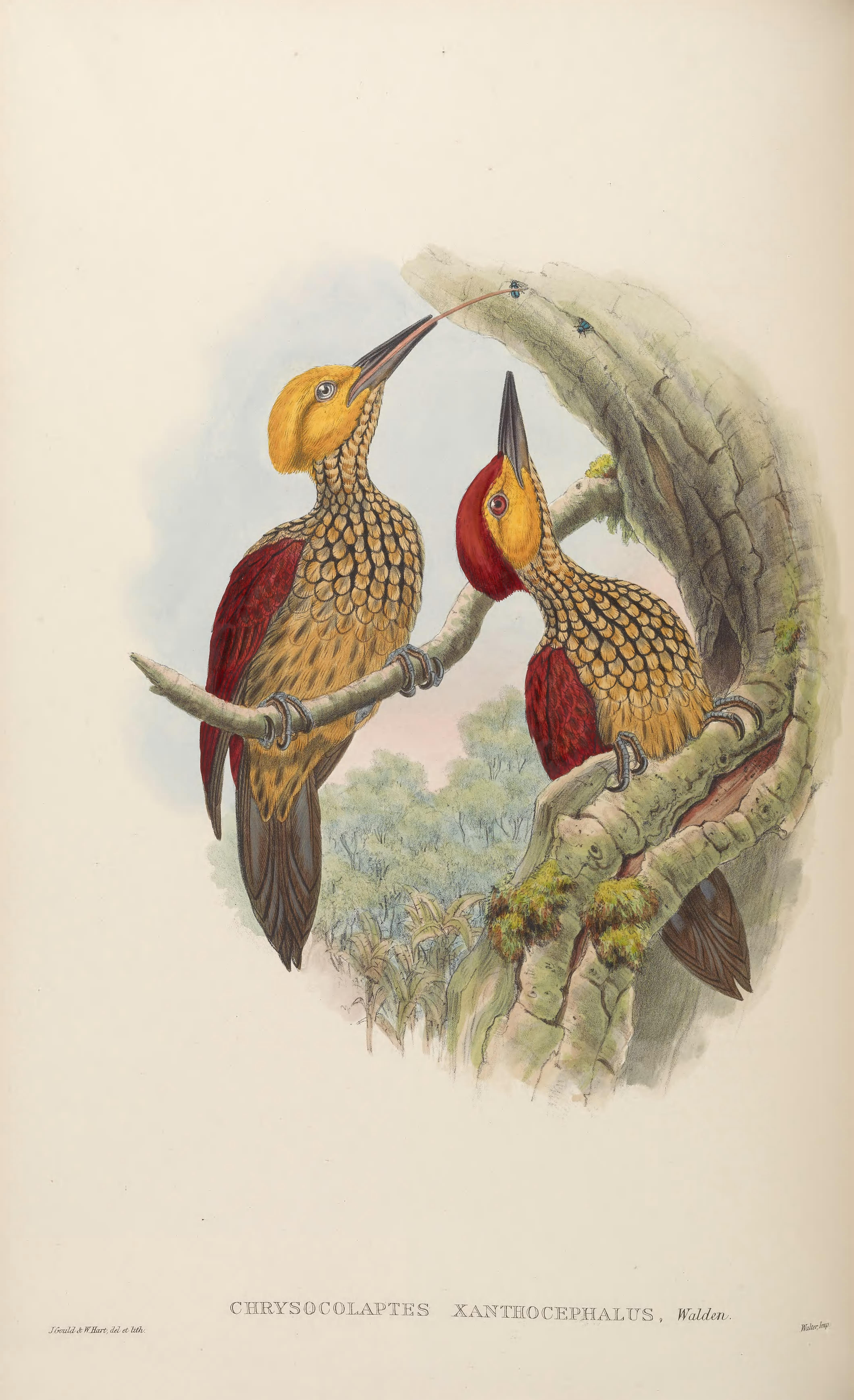
An illustration by a pair of Yellow-faced Flameback by John Gould

It is a large species of woodpecker found in the lowland and montane forests of Panay and Negros. It has a bright red back, black tail and yellow belly and cheek. Neck is yellow with black spots. LIke all other flamebacks, it has an angular crest and a sturdy chisel shaped bill.

They exhibit sexual dimorphism in which males have red crests and the females have yellow crests.

Its call is described as a loud trill.

It was formerly part of the Greater flameback species complex. Relative to other members it is slightly smaller.

== Taxonomy ==
This species is part of the Greater flameback species complex which has now been split into 8 distinct species. This species is the most striking and colorful due to its yellow face and body and brighter red colors.

== Ecology and behavior ==
Not much is known about this species specific diet but based on other flameback species it is presumed to feed on large caterpillars, wood-boring larvaes, pupaes and ants. It is often seen foraging on larger trees and snags pecking and hammering the wood to find insects. Often seen in pairs or small family groups and even with White-bellied woodpecker.

Nests in tree cavities. The very similar Greater flameback lays 2 to 5 eggs which incubate in 2 weeks and fledge within a month.

== Habitat and conservation status ==
Found in primary forest, mature secondary forest to lighter secondary forest with dense under-storey, dense riparian vegetation but also in mango groves and close to human settlements and breeds between February and August. The highest known elevation for the yellow-faced flameback appears to be 900 m on Kanlaon, Negros and it appears to be a lowland forest specialist.

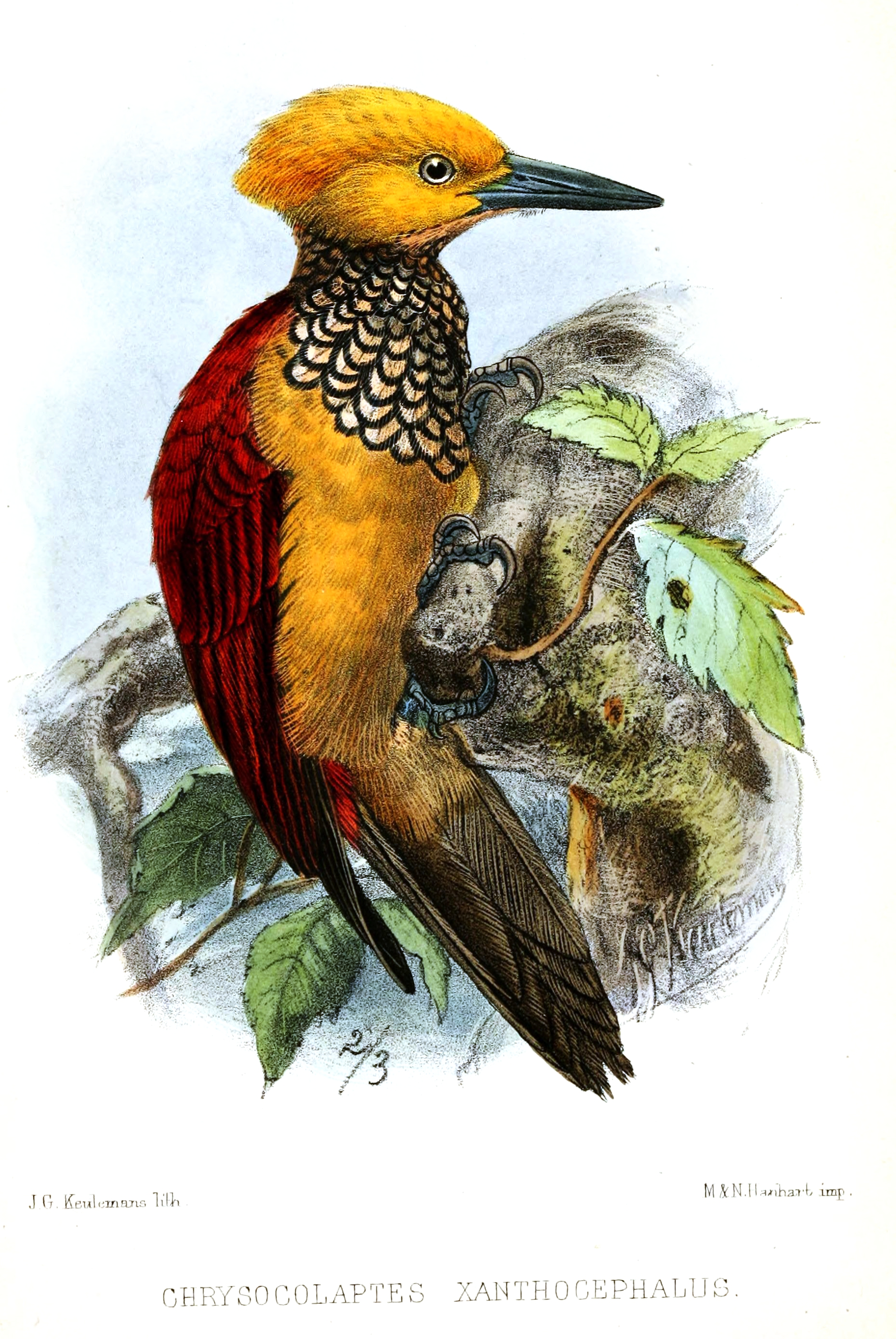
An illustration by Joseph Smit of a female Yellow-faced Flameback

The IUCN has assessed this bird as endangered with a population estimate of 1,100 – 5,500 mature individuals as of 2025. This species' main threat is habitat loss.

Habitat loss on both Negros and Panay has been extensive. Primary forests have been almost totally destroyed on Negros (where just 4% of any type of forest cover remained in 1988) and Panay (where 8% remained). Habitat degradation, through clearance for agriculture, timber and charcoal-burning, continues to pose a serious threat to remaining fragments. In 2002 remaining forest at all elevations on Negros and Panay was calculated at 501 km^{2} and 984 km^{2} respectively but the current figure is doubtless much lower, and lowland forest makes up an increasingly small proportion of the total. There may be little if any suitable forest remaining on Guimaras, Masbate and Ticao.

It is recommended to conduct surveys in potentially suitable habitat in order to calculate density estimates, and calculate remaining extent of suitable habitat to refine the population estimate. Encourage careful reforestation activities around remaining forests and law enforcement to stop small-scale yet rampant illegal logging.
