= Buad Island =

Island in the Philippines

- Location within Philippines

Geography
- Coordinates: 11°39′41″N 124°51′22″E
- Adjacent to: Samar Sea

Administration
- Philippines
- Region: Eastern Visayas
- Province: Samar
- Municipality: Zumarraga

Buad Island lies within the municipal boundaries of Zumarraga, Samar in the province of Samar, Philippines. As of the 2020 census, the municipality had a population of 16,279.
