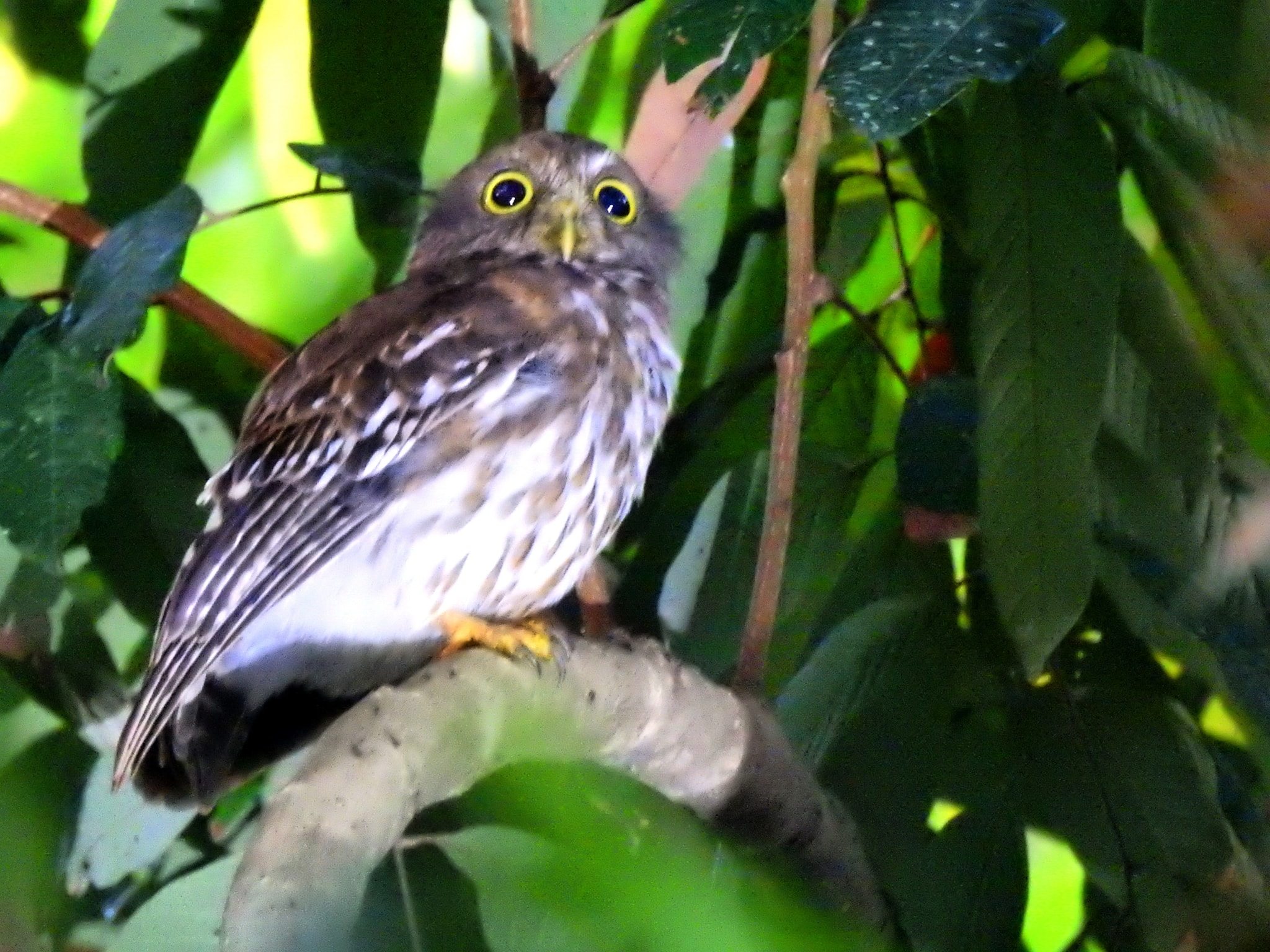
- Ninox philippensis philippinensis seen in Laguna

Conservation status
- Least Concern (IUCN 3.1)
- CITES Appendix II

Scientific classification
- Kingdom: Animalia
- Phylum: Chordata
- Class: Aves
- Order: Strigiformes
- Family: Strigidae
- Genus: Ninox
- Species complex: Philippine hawk-owl species complex
- Species: N. philippensis

Binomial name
- Ninox philippensis Bonaparte, 1855
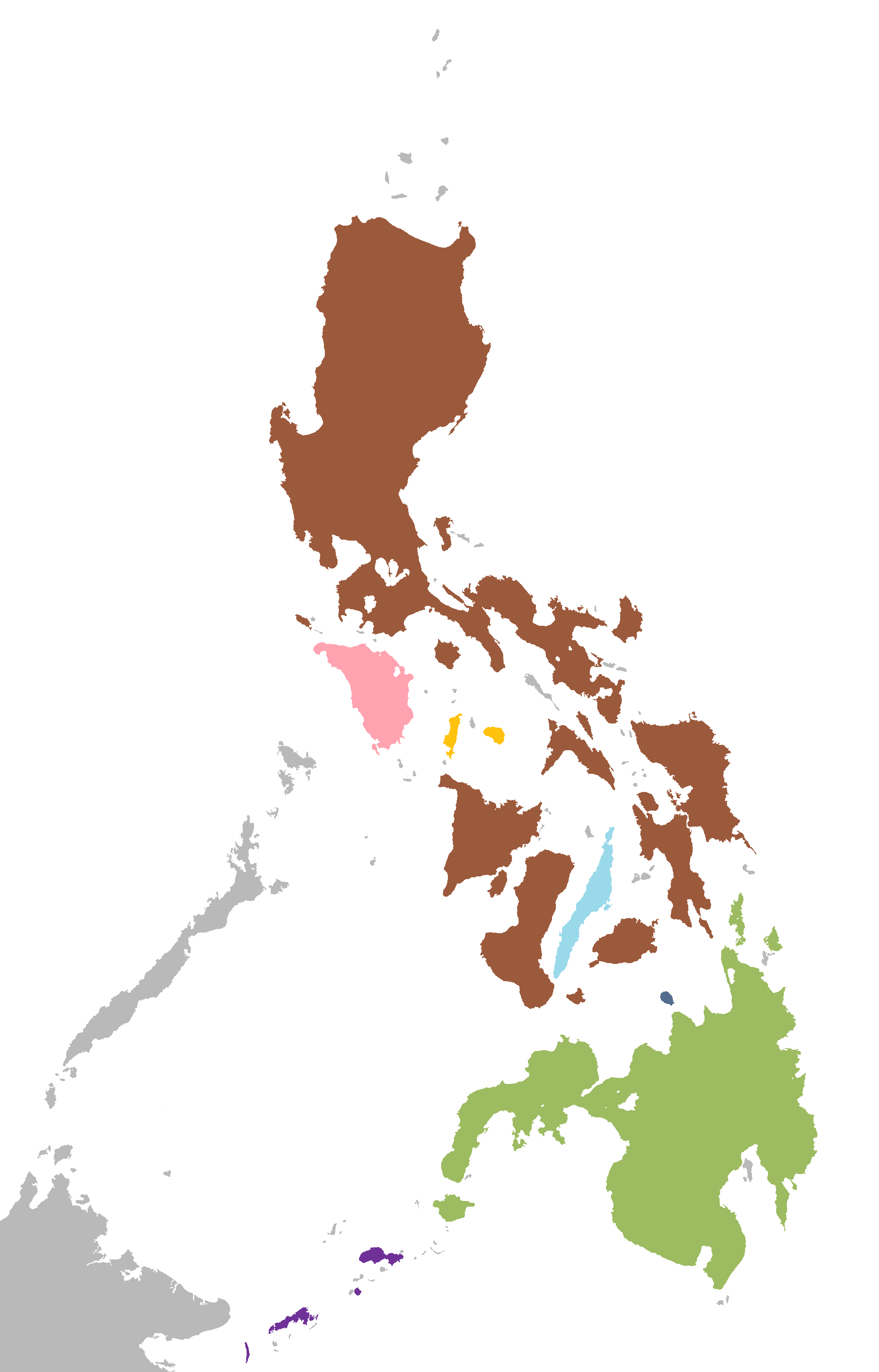
- Brown: Luzon Hawk Owl Ninox philippensis, including N. p. ticaoensis and N. p. centralis

= Luzon boobook =

Species of owl

The Luzon boobook (Ninox philippensis) or Luzon hawk owl, also Philippine hawk owl or Philippine boobook, is a species of owl in the family Strigidae. It is endemic to the Philippines where it lives in forests. It is a brown and white mottled bird and males and females look much alike.

== Description ==
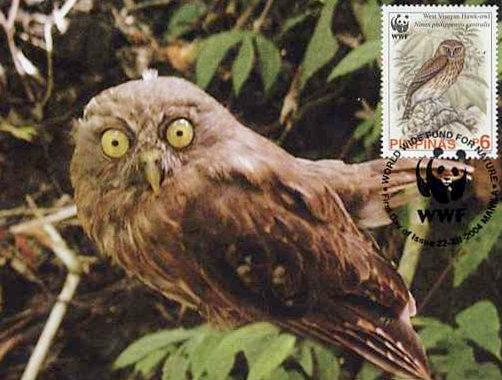
''Ninox philippensis centralis'' on a 2004 stamp and postcard of the Philippines

The Luzon boobook is one of the smallest of the owls in the Philippine hawk-owl complex. It has white eyebrow-like streaks above the eyes and the beak and a white moustache forming an x-shape on the head. It does not have tufts of feathers on its head resembling ears. The upper parts of all subspecies are brown, and the wings are mottled with oval-shaped white spots. The tail is dark brown with narrow white stripes. The sides of the head are brown, the chin is a whitish colour, while the rest of the underparts are pale white with wide brown streaks which are more prominent on the breast. The underside of the tail is white. The chequered subspecies have these reticulated patterns on the underparts, on the head, the upper parts of the back and the wings. The feet are partially covered with feathers and are pale yellow. The beak is olive.

== Taxonomy ==
There are three recognised subspecies:

- Ninox philippensis philippensis – Found on Biliran, Buad, Catanduanes, Leyte, Luzon, Marinduque, Polillo and Samar
- Ninox philippensis centralis – Found on Bohol, Boracay, Carabao, Guimaras, Negros, Panay, Semirara and Siquijor; duller brown and less spots on underparts
- Ninox philippensis ticaoensis – Found on Ticao; slightly smaller than nominate and with darker plumage

== Ecology and behaviour ==
It feeds on insects, frogs, small rodents and even birds. The breeding season for this species starts around February utilizing hollows in trees as nesting sites. Fledglings reported in March and May

== Habitat and conservation Status ==
The Luzon boobook can be found in forest areas up to an altitude of 1,800 m (5,906 ft) above sea level, although they mostly reside in areas below 1,000 m (3,281 ft). Its natural habitats are subtropical or tropical moist lowland forests and tropical moist montane forests.

This species is listed by the International Union for Conservation of Nature as least concern as it is still locally common and tolerant of habitat disturbance. However, its population is declining due to complete habitat clearance across its range.

It is found in numerous protected areas including Northern Sierra Madre Natural Park, Bataan National Park, Northwest Panay Peninsula Natural Park, Northern Negros Natural Park, Rajah Sikatuna Protected Landscape and Samar Island Natural Park but actual protection from deforestation is still lax.
