= Yellownape =

Yellownape may refer to the following species:

- Greater yellownape (Chrysophlegma flavinucha)
- Lesser yellownape (Picus chlorolophus)
- Javan yellownape (Chrysophlegma mentale)
