= Sooty woodpecker =

Sooty woodpecker may refer to:

- Northern sooty woodpecker, endemic to Luzon, Marinduque, Catanduanes, and the Polillo Islands in the Philippines
- Southern sooty woodpecker, endemic to Mindanao, Leyte, Biliran, and Samar in the Philippines
