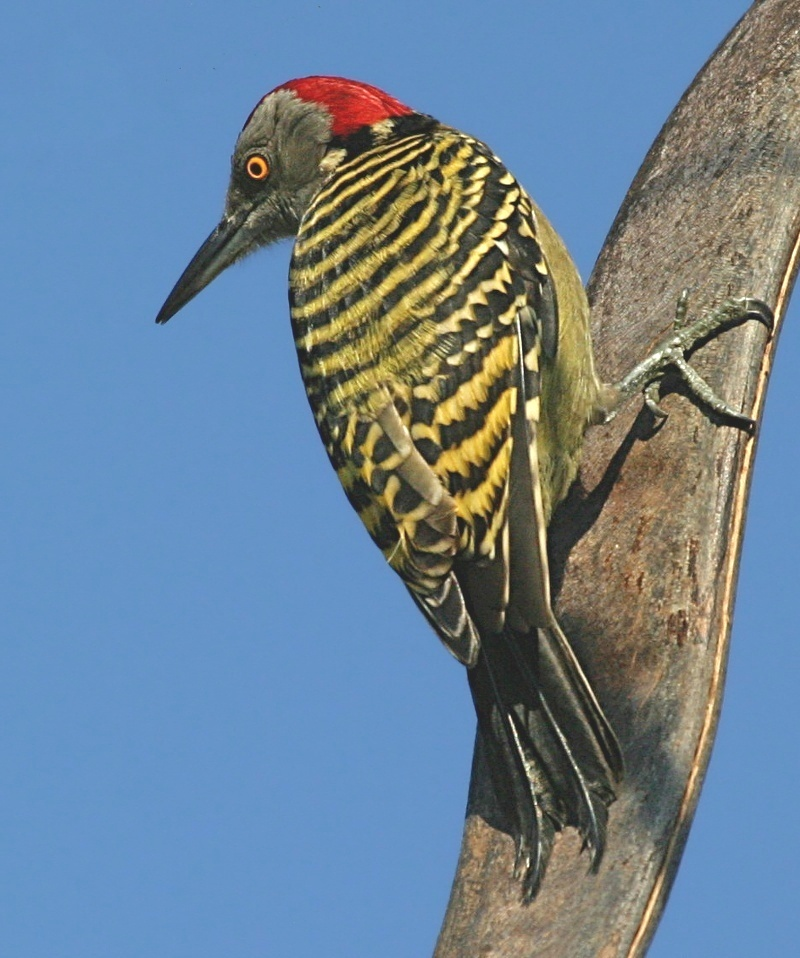
- Hispaniolan woodpecker

Scientific classification
- Kingdom: Animalia
- Phylum: Chordata
- Class: Aves
- Order: Piciformes
- Family: Picidae
- Subfamily: Picinae; Bonaparte 1838

Genera
- Several, see text

= Picinae =

Woodpeckers

Subfamily of birds

Picinae containing the true woodpeckers is one of four subfamilies that make up the woodpecker family Picidae. True woodpeckers are found over much of the world, but do not occur in Madagascar or Australasia.

Woodpeckers gained their English name because of the habit of some species of tapping and pecking noisily on tree trunks with their beaks and heads. This is both a means of communication to signal possession of territory to their rivals, and a method of locating and accessing insect larvae found under the bark or in long winding tunnels in the tree or upright log.

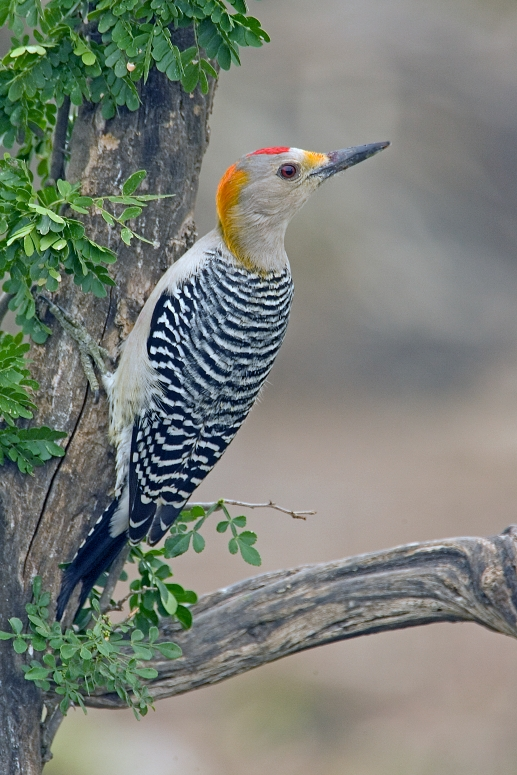
Golden-fronted woodpecker, Melanerpes aurifrons

== Physiology and behaviour ==
Some woodpeckers and wrynecks in the order Piciformes have zygodactyl feet, with two toes pointing forward, and two backward. These feet, though adapted for clinging to a vertical surface, can be used for grasping or perching. Several species have only three toes. The woodpecker's long tongue, in many cases as long as the woodpecker itself, can be darted forward to capture insects. The tongue is not attached to the woodpecker's head in the same way as it is in most birds, but instead it curls back up around its skull, which allows it to be so long.

The woodpecker first locates a tunnel by tapping on the trunk with its head. Once a tunnel is found, the woodpecker chisels out wood until it makes an opening into the tunnel. Then it worms its tongue into the tunnel to try to locate the grub. The tongue of the woodpecker is long and ends in a barb. With its tongue the woodpecker skewers the grub and draws it out of the trunk.

Woodpeckers also use their beaks to create larger holes for their nests which are 15–45 cm (6–18 inches) below the opening. These nests are lined only with wood chips and hold 2–8 white eggs. Because the nests are out of sight, they are not visible to predators and eggs do not need to be camouflaged. Cavities created by woodpeckers are also reused as nests by other birds, such as grackles, starlings, some ducks and owls, and mammals, such as tree squirrels.

Several adaptations combine to protect the woodpecker's brain from the substantial pounding that the pecking behaviour causes: it has a relatively thick skull with relatively spongy bone to cushion the brain; there is very little cerebrospinal fluid in its small subarachnoid space; the bird contracts mandibular muscles just before impact, thus transmitting the impact past the brain and allowing its whole body to help absorb the shock; its relatively small brain is less prone to concussion than other animals'.

Some species have modified joints between bones in the skull and upper jaw, as well as muscles which contract to absorb the shock of the hammering. Strong neck and tail-feather muscles, and a chisel-like bill are other hammering adaptations which are seen in most species. Other species of woodpecker, such as the Flicker, uses its long tongue primarily to grab prey from the ground or from under loose bark. It has few shock-absorbing adaptations, and prefers to feed on the ground or to chip away at rotting wood and bark, habits observed in birds outside of the woodpecker family. A "continuum" in skull structures, from little- to highly specialized for pounding is seen in different genera (groups of related species) of woodpeckers alive today. In his classic "Birds of America," John James Audubon describes the slight gradations in hyoid horn length found in different species of living woodpeckers. The slack of tongue is kept under the loose skin behind its neck. The tiny bones divide into essentially two tongues, coming back together before entering the beak.

== Systematics ==
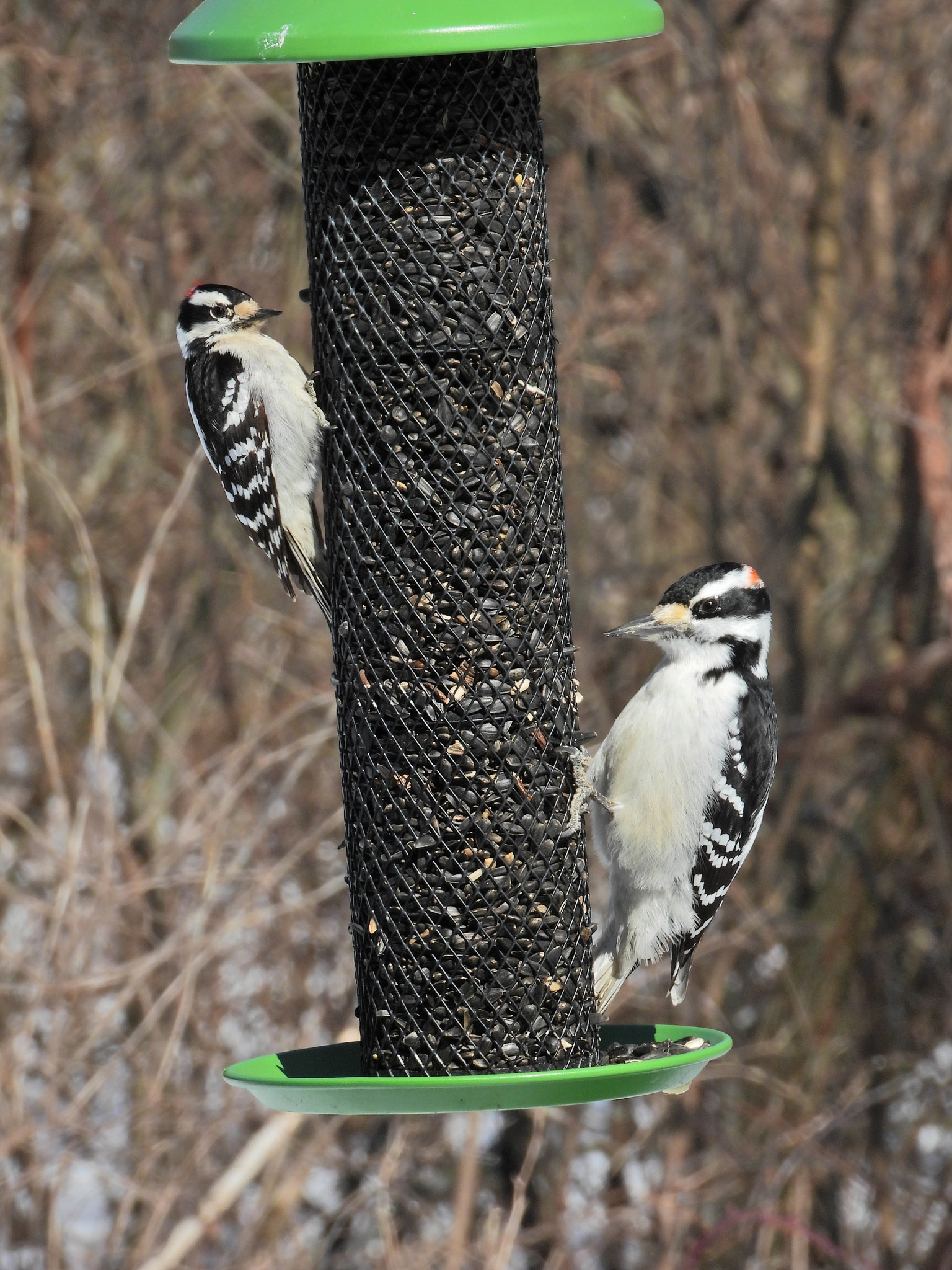
Downy woodpecker (Dryobates pubescens) and hairy woodpecker (Leuconotopicus villosus) at a feeder in Ontario, Canada

The systematics of woodpeckers is quite convoluted. Based on an assumption of unrealistically low convergence in details of plumage and behavior, 5 subfamilies were distinguished. However, it has turned out that similar plumage patterns and modes of life are not reliable to determine higher phylogenetic relationships in woodpeckers, and thus only 3 subfamilies should be accepted.

For example, the genera Dryocopus (Eurasia and Americas) and Campephilus (Americas) of large woodpeckers were believed to form a distinct group. However, they are quite unrelated and instead close, respectively, to the genera, Mulleripicus and Chrysocolaptes, of Southeast Asia. In addition, the genus allocation of many species, e.g. the rufous woodpecker, has turned out to be in error, and some taxa with unclear relationships could be placed into the phylogeny.

In 1975 John Morony and colleagues in their Reference List of the Birds of the World divided the true woodpeckers into six tribes: Melanerpini, Campetherini, Colaptini, Campephilini, Picini, Meiglyptini. This classification was used in 1982 by Lesley Short in his Woodpeckers of the World. The introduction of molecular methods led to a substantial reorganization of the phylogeny making the earlier groups obsolete. In 2005 David Webb and William Moore divided the main woodpecker genera into three tribes: Megapicini, Malarpicini and Dendropicini. These names were rapidly accepted by other ornithologists but in 2013 Edward Dickinson and Leslie Christidis in the fourth edition of the Howard and Moore Complete Checklist of the Birds of the World rejected these new names on the grounds that the earlier names had precedence. Webb and Moore's Malarpicini, Megapicini and Dendropicini were replaced by Pici, Campephilini and Melanerpini. Dickinson and Christidis also introduced Nesoctitini for the Antillean piculets and Hemicircini for the two species in Hemicircus giving a total of five tribes.

=== Genera ===
- Picinae
  - - Hemicircini
      Hemicircus
    - Nesoctitini
      Nesoctites
  - - Picini
      - - - Dinopium
          - Gecinulus
        - - Meiglyptes
          - Micropternus
      - - - - Dryocopus
            - Mulleripicus
          - - Celeus
            - - Colaptes
              - Piculus
        - - Picus
          - - Chrysophlegma
            - - Pardipicus
              - - Campethera
                - Geocolaptes
    - - Campephilini
        - Campephilus
        - - Blythipicus
          - - Chrysocolaptes
            - Reinwardtipicus
      - Melanerpini
        - - Melanerpes
          - Sphyrapicus
        - - - Picoides
            - Yungipicus
          - - - - Chloropicus
                - Dendropicos
              - - Dendrocoptes
                - Leiopicus
            - - Dendrocopos
              - - Dryobates
                - - Leuconotopicus
                  - Veniliornis

Relationships between the genera based on a phylogenetic study by Sabir Shakya and colleagues published in 2017.

The AviList world bird list recognises 206 species of true woodpecker which are split up into 32 genera. The division into tribes is based on the 2017 study by Subir Shakya and colleagues.

Tribe Nesoctitini

- Nesoctites – monotypic: Antillean piculet (Caribbean)

Tribe Hemicircini

- Hemicircus – 2 species (Indomalaya)

Tribe Picini

- Micropternus – monotypic: rufous woodpecker (Indomalaya)
- Meiglyptes – 4 species (Indomalaya)
- Gecinulus – 3 species (Indomalaya)
- Dinopium – 5 species, flamebacks (Indomalaya)
- Picus – 14 species (Indomalaya and Palearctic)
- Chrysophlegma – 3 species (Indomalaya)
- Pardipicus – 2 species (Africa)
- Geocolaptes – monotypic: ground woodpecker (Africa)
- Campethera – 11 species (Africa)
- Mulleripicus – 4 species (Indomalaya)
- Dryocopus – 6 species (Eurasia and Americas)
- Celeus – 12 species (Neotropic)
- Piculus – 7 species (Neotropic)
- Colaptes – 14 species (Americas)

Tribe Campephilini

- Campephilus – 12 species (Americas)
- Blythipicus – 2 species (Indomalaya)
- Reinwardtipicus – monotypic: orange-backed woodpecker (Indomalaya)
- Chrysocolaptes – 9 species, flamebacks (Indomalaya)

Tribe Melanerpini (pied woodpeckers)

- Sphyrapicus – 4 species, sapsuckers (Americas)
- Melanerpes – 23 species (Americas)
- Picoides – 3 species (Holarctic)
- Yungipicus – 7 species (Asia)
- Leiopicus – monotypic: yellow-crowned woodpecker (Indomalaya)
- Dendrocoptes – 3 species (Eurasia)
- Chloropicus – 3 species (Africa)
- Dendropicos – 12 species (Africa)
- Dendrocopos – 12 species (Eurasia)
- Dryobates – 6 species (Americas and Eurasia) (Note: In the eBird/Clements Checklist of Birds of the World which is maintained by the Cornell Lab of Ornithology, the genus Dryobates is expanded to include the species in Leuconotopicus and Veniliornis.)
- Leuconotopicus – 6 species (Americas)
- Veniliornis – 14 species (Neotropic)
- Xiphidiopicus – monotypic: Cuban green woodpecker (Caribbean) (Note: The Cuban green woodpecker (Xiphidiopicus percussus) was not sampled by Shakya and colleagues in their 2017 study. An earlier study in which DNA sequences of mitochondrial cytochrome-b were compared indicated that the Cuban woodpecker was most closely related to species in the genus Melanerpes.)

=== Unassigned fossil forms ===
- Genus Palaeonerpes (Ogallala Early Pliocene of Hitchcock County, USA) - possibly dendropicine
- Genus Pliopicus (Early Pliocene of Kansas, USA) - possibly dendropicine
- cf. Colaptes DMNH 1262 (Early Pliocene of Ainsworth, USA) - possibly malarpicine
