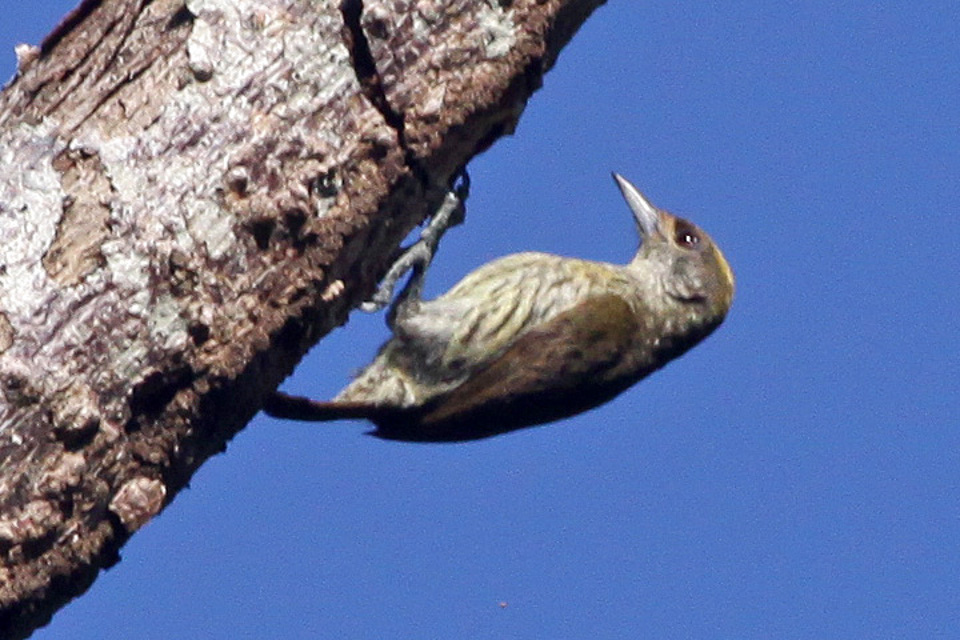

Conservation status
- Least Concern (IUCN 3.1)

Scientific classification
- Kingdom: Animalia
- Phylum: Chordata
- Class: Aves
- Order: Piciformes
- Family: Picidae
- Subfamily: Picinae
- Tribe: Nesoctitini
- Genus: Nesoctites; Hargitt, 1890
- Species: N. micromegas

Binomial name
- Nesoctites micromegas (Sundevall, 1866)

= Antillean piculet =

Species of woodpecker

Details of beak, tail and hand region of wing (the latter two as seen from above)

The Antillean piculet (Nesoctites micromegas) is a species of bird in subfamily Picinae of the woodpecker family Picidae. It is endemic to the Caribbean island of Hispaniola that is shared by the Dominican Republic and Haiti.

== Taxonomy and systematics ==
The Antillean piculet is the only member of genus Nesoctites. The species is evolutionarily distinct from the other piculets, and some taxonomists afford it its own subfamily Nesoctitinae. A fossil feather in amber attributed to the genus has been found in the Dominican Republic, showing that the ancestors of the species have been isolated on Hispaniola for at least 25 million years.

The Antillean piculet has two subspecies, the nominate N. m. micromegas (Sundevall, 1866) and N. m. abbotti (Wetmore, 1928).

== Description ==
The Antillean piculet is 14 to 16 cm (5.5 to 6.3 in) long and weighs 26 to 33 g (0.92 to 1.2 oz). It is the largest piculet, and is about double the size of the Neotropical piculets of genus Picumnus. Adult males of the nominate subspecies have a lemon yellow crown with an orange-red to red patch in the center. Their hindneck is yellowish green and their upperparts dull olive green to yellow-green with a faint rusty-bronze tinge. Their wings are olive green and the flight feathers have yellow-green edges. Their tail is browish olive with a bronze cast. Their cheeks are dull whitish with olive barring, their chin and throat white with a faint yellow tinge, and the rest of their underparts pale yellowish white. The throat has a few small dark spots and the breast and belly have wide dark streaks. Adult females are larger than males and have the same plumage except without the red crown spot. Juveniles are overall duller than adults, do not have a red crown spot, and have obscure barring rather than streaks on their underparts. Subspecies N. m. abbotti is paler than the nominate and has less yellow on the crown, grayer upperparts, a plainer white throat, and less heavy streaks on the underparts.

== Distribution and habitat ==
The nominate subspecies of Antillean piuculet is found throughout the main island of Hispaniola. N. m. abbotti is restricted to Gonâve Island off the west coast of Haiti. The species inhabits a variety of landscapes including humid and dry broadleaf forests, Hispaniolan pine forests dominated by Pinus occidentalis, semi-arid scrubland, and thorn forest. It also occurs in mangrove forest and occasionally in orchards and plantations. In all habitats it favors dense undergrowth. In elevation it is most numerous between about 400 and 800 m (1,310 and 2,620 ft) but occurs as high as 1,770 m (5,800 ft) in Sierra de Bahoruco of southwestern Dominican Republic.

== Behavior ==
=== Movement ===
The Antillean piculet is a year-round resident throughout its range.

=== Feeding ===
The Antillean piculet mostly forages in the forest understorey below about 8 m (26 ft), but will feed in the crown as well. It mostly hunts by gleaning small branches, twigs, and vines rather than tree trunks, and also probes flowers and clusters of leaves and pine needles. It hunts singly or in pairs. Its diet is mostly insects, especially ants and beetles, and includes other arthropods and a relatively large amount of fruit.

=== Breeding ===
The Antillean piculet's breeding season is from February to July. It excavates a nest hole or occupies one abandoned by another woodpecker, typically within 5 m (16 ft) off the ground in a stump, tree, palm, or fence post. Pairs are highly territorial and will aggressively call and display towards intruders. The clutch size is two to four eggs; the incubation period and time to fledging are not known.

=== Vocalization ===
The Antillean piculet has a variety of vocalizations. Members of a pair use "kuk-ki-ki-ki-ke-ku-kuk" as a contact and territorial call. Its alarm calls are "mechanical 'pit' and 'pew' notes" and it makes a "continuous noisy 'yeh-yeh-yeh-yeh' chatter during fights". In contrast to many other woodpeckers, it is not known to drum.
