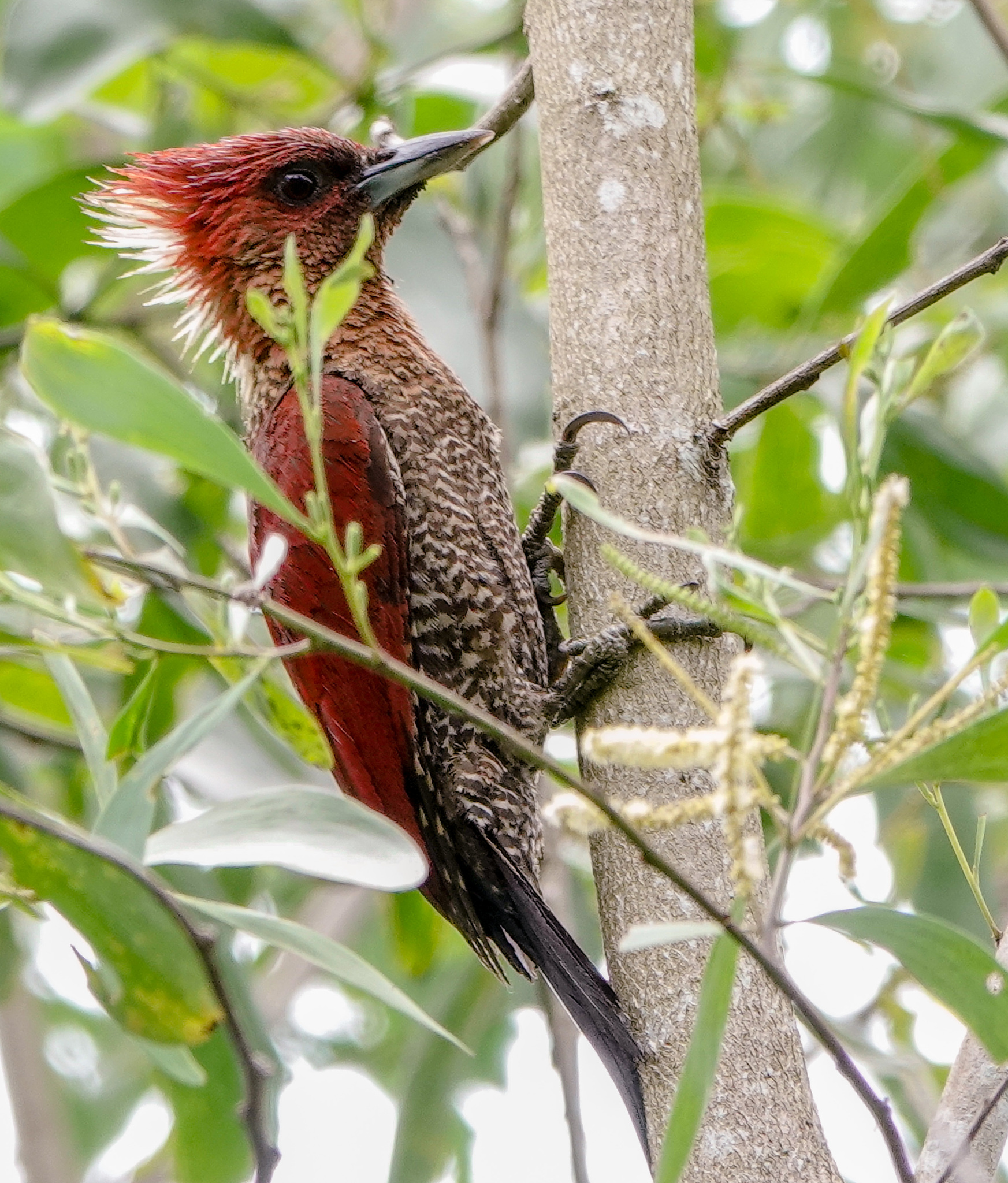

Conservation status
- Least Concern (IUCN 3.1)

Scientific classification
- Kingdom: Animalia
- Phylum: Chordata
- Class: Aves
- Order: Piciformes
- Family: Picidae
- Genus: Chrysophlegma
- Species: C. miniaceum

Binomial name
- Chrysophlegma miniaceum (Pennant, 1769)

Synonyms
- Picus mineaceus

= Banded woodpecker =

Species of bird

The banded woodpecker (Chrysophlegma miniaceum) or the banded red woodpecker is a species of bird in the family Picidae. It is found in Brunei, Indonesia, Malaysia, Myanmar, Singapore, and Thailand. Its natural habitats are subtropical or tropical moist lowland forests and subtropical or tropical mangrove forests.

== Description ==
The upper parts of the banded woodpecker are predominantly rufous-brown. The mantle is dull olive scaled with buff and the rump is yellow. The tail is chocolate-brown. The head is mostly rufous-brown with a shaggy yellowish nape. The chin, neck and throat are reddish-brown, the breast reddish barred with olive and the belly whitish, heavily barred with brownish-black. The sexes differ slightly; the male has a redder face and throat while the female's face and throat are browner, flecked with white. Both sexes have a dark beak, a chestnut eye with a bluish orbital ring, and greenish legs. Adult birds are about 26 cm (10 in) long.

== Distribution and habitat ==
The species is native to tropical southeastern Asia. Its range extends from southern Myanmar through the Malay Peninsula, Sumatra and Borneo to Java. It is a sedentary, non-migratory species and is mainly found in the lowlands. Its main habitat is primary rainforest with vines, epiphytes, tangled shrubs and fallen trees, but it also inhabits secondary forest, plantations, coastal scrub, mangroves, parks, wooded suburbs and overgrown gardens.

== Ecology ==
The banded woodpecker feeds singly or in pairs, foraging unobtrusively among vines and dense cover as well as higher in the canopy, probing into crevices, moss and epiphytes. The main items of diet are ants, their eggs and larvae, as well as other small invertebrates.

Breeding takes place at different times of year in different parts of the range. In the Malay Peninsula, nesting activities have been seen in January, with nestlings being present between February and August.

== Status ==
C. miniaceum has a very wide range and is described as common in some areas and uncommon in others. The population has not been quantified, but in the absence of evidence to the contrary, is believed to be steady, especially as this bird has adapted to the use of man-made habitats. The International Union for Conservation of Nature has assessed its conservation status as being of "least concern".

== Gallery ==
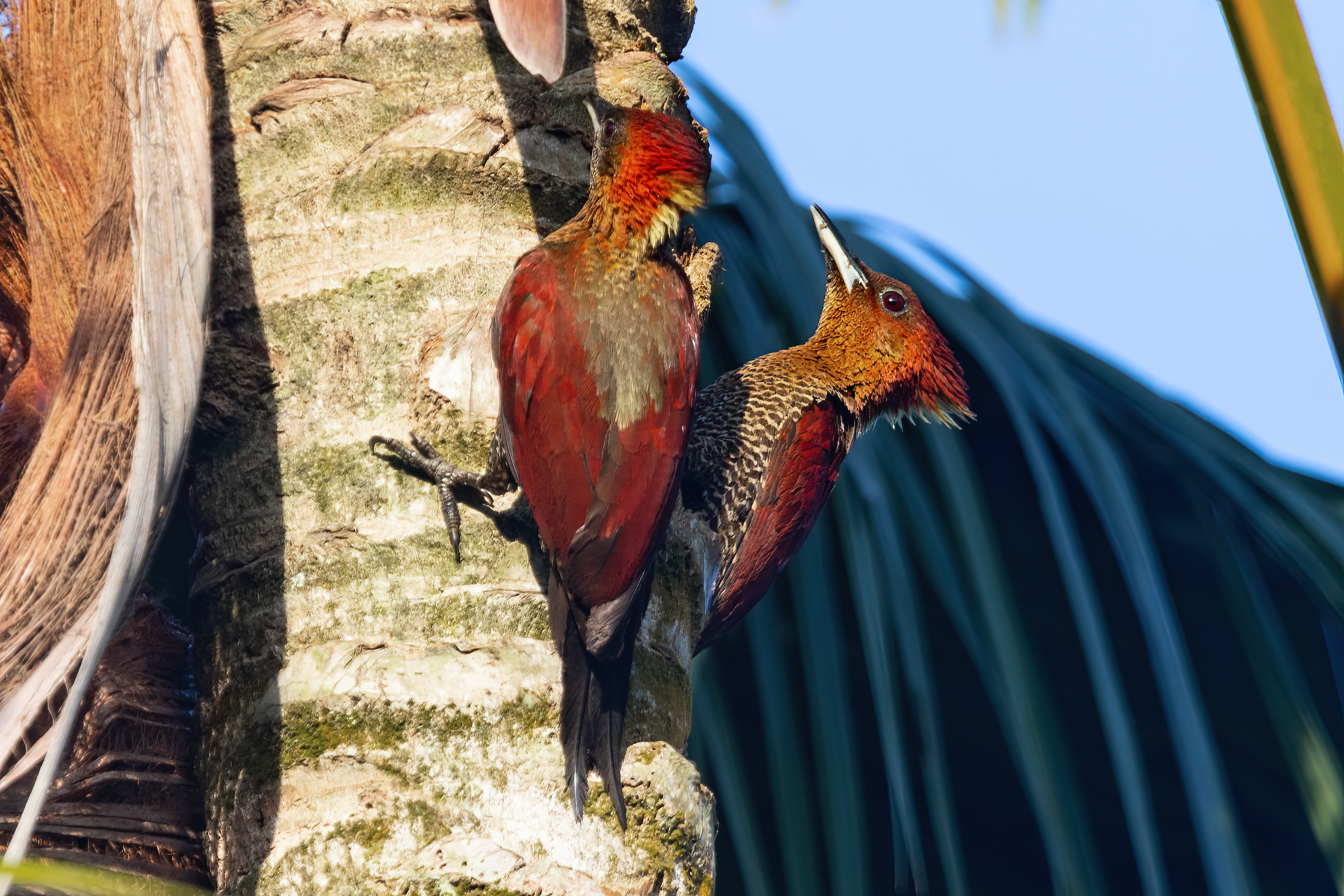

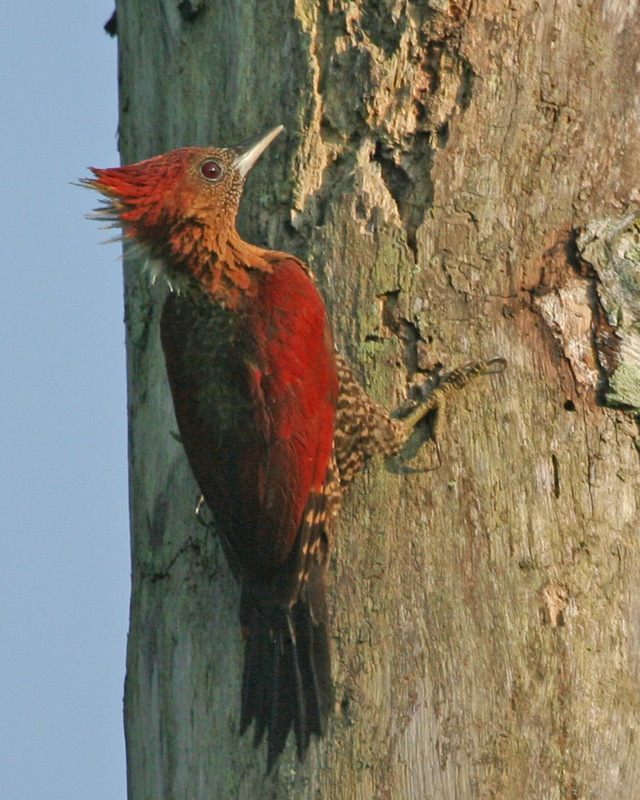

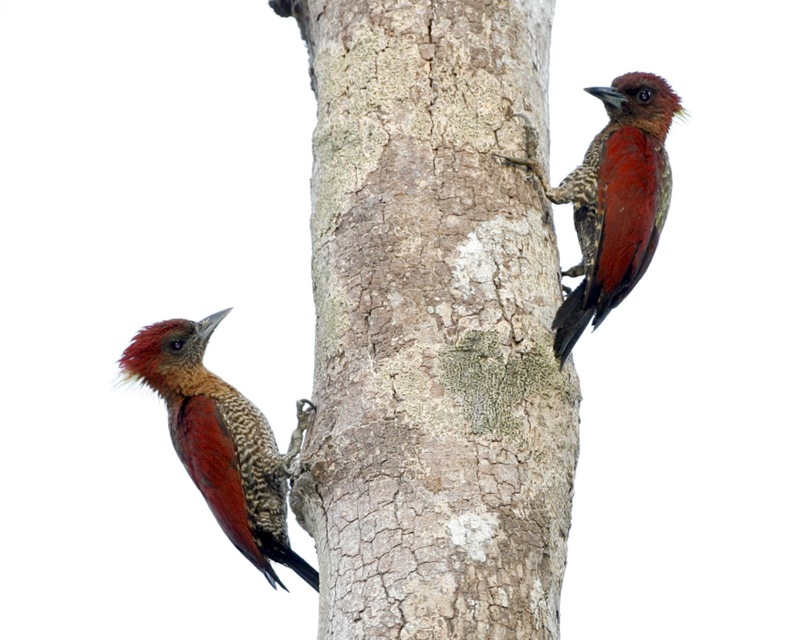
