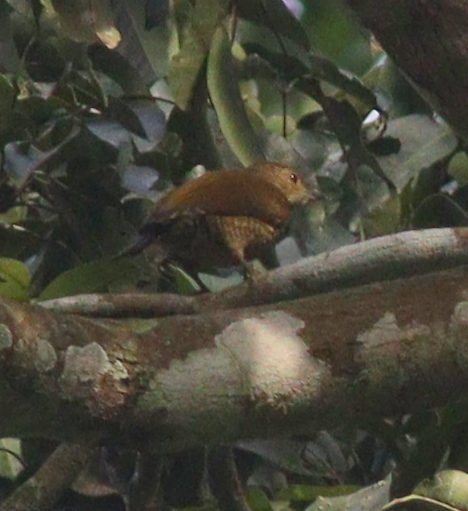

Conservation status
- Least Concern (IUCN 3.1)

Scientific classification
- Kingdom: Animalia
- Phylum: Chordata
- Class: Aves
- Order: Piciformes
- Family: Picidae
- Genus: Pardipicus
- Species: P. nivosus

Binomial name
- Pardipicus nivosus (Swainson, 1837)
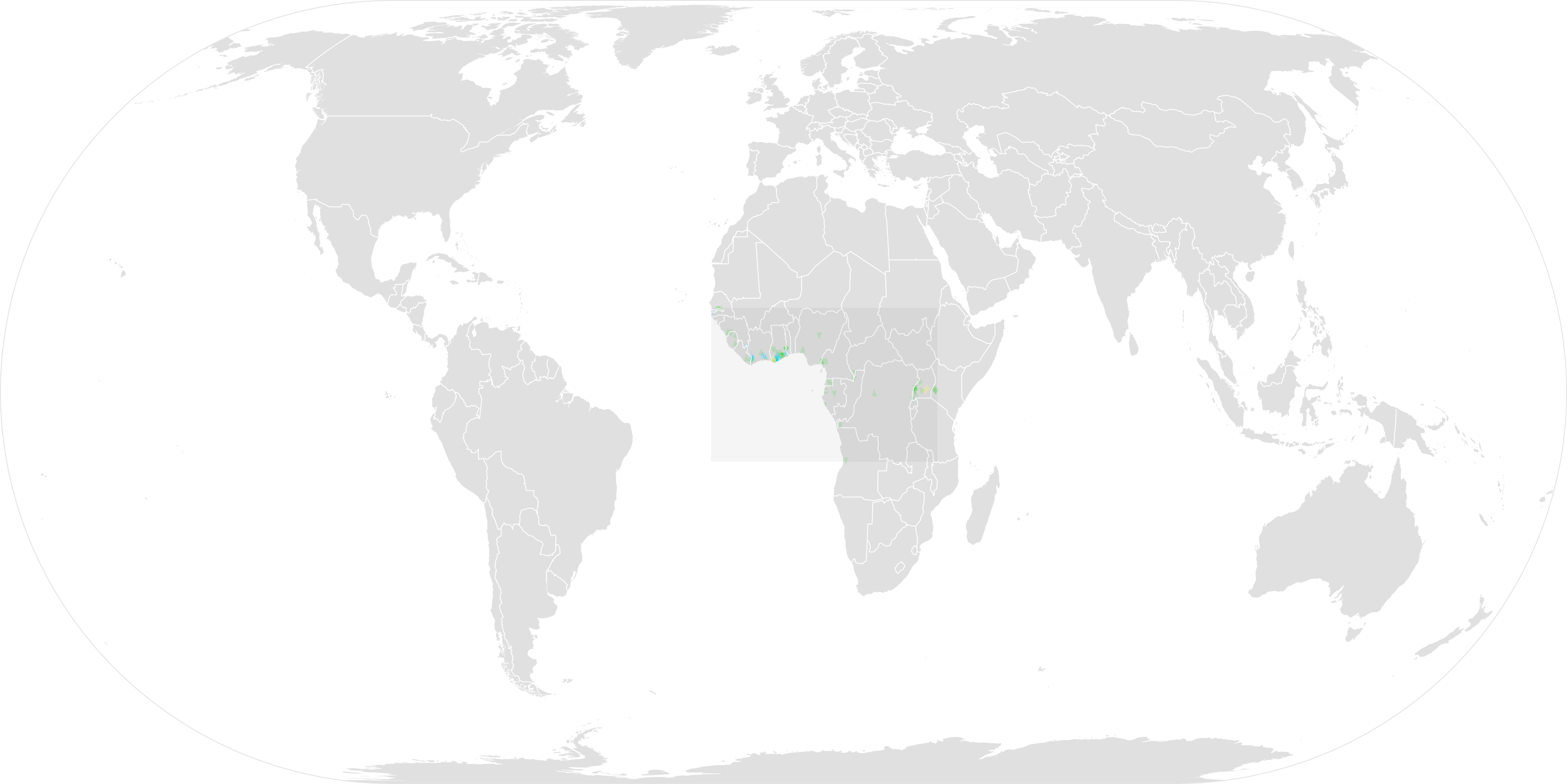
- Distribution of reports to eBird Year-Round Range Summer Range Winter Range

= Buff-spotted woodpecker =

Species of bird

The buff-spotted woodpecker (Pardipicus nivosus) is a species of bird in the family Picidae. It is native to large parts of tropical central Africa. It has an extremely wide range and is an uncommon species, and the International Union for Conservation of Nature has rated its conservation status as being of "least concern".

== Description ==
The buff-spotted woodpecker is a small species growing to a length of about 15 cm (6 in). The male has a dark olive or blackish crown and a bright red nape, with the other parts of the head whitish or buff streaked with olive. The female lacks the red nape. Both sexes have plain green upper parts, and yellowish-olive or dark olive underparts, spotted or barred with buff. The beak is curved and rather short.

== Distribution and habitat ==
The buff-spotted woodpecker is native to the African tropical rainforest. Its typical habitat is primary and secondary tropical forest at altitudes of up to about 1,800 m (5,900 ft), but most common at altitudes less than 950 m (3,100 ft).

== Ecology ==
The buff-spotted woodpecker feeds largely on black ants (Crematogaster) and termites which it finds on trees. It is an inconspicuous, silent bird, often foraging singly or in pairs in the understorey layers of the forest, or it may form part of small groups of mixed species.

== Status ==
The buff-spotted woodpecker has an extremely wide range and is a common species in some localities, though less so in others. No particular threats have been recognised and the population is presumed to be steady. The International Union for Conservation of Nature has rated its conservation status as being of "least concern".
