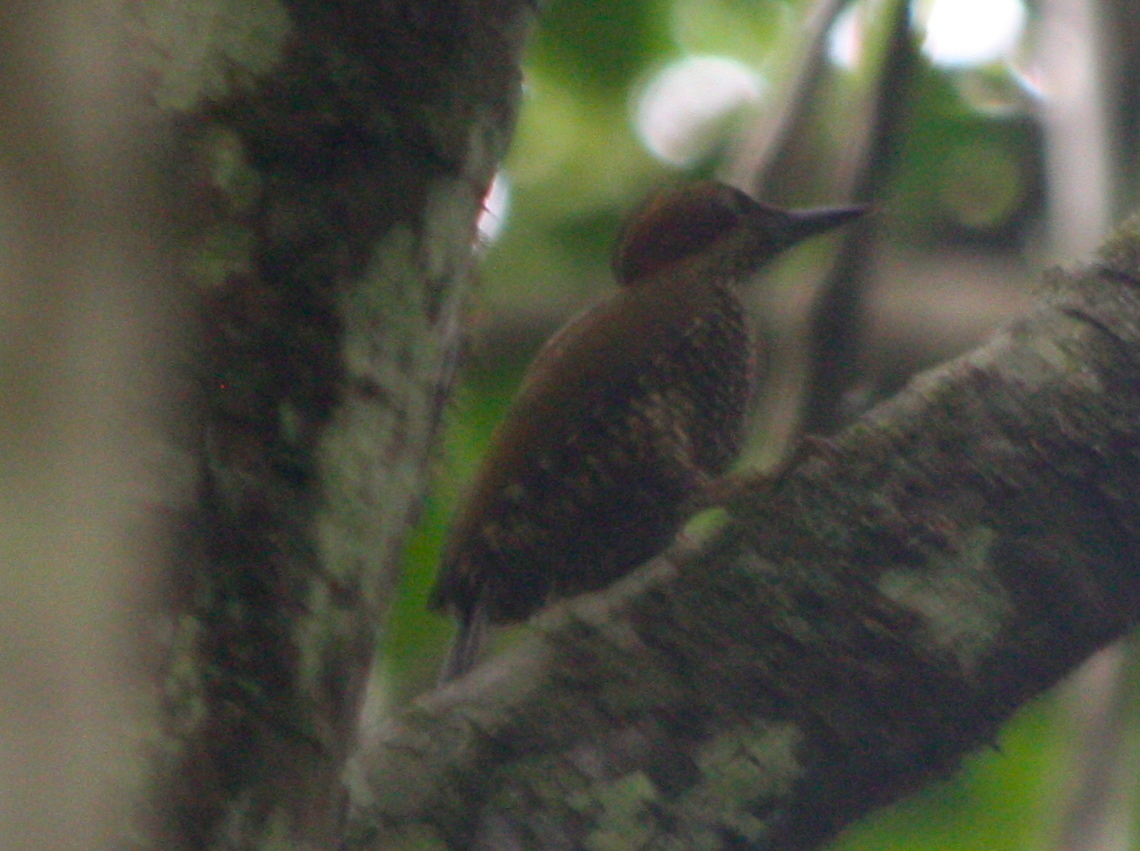

Conservation status
- Least Concern (IUCN 3.1)

Scientific classification
- Kingdom: Animalia
- Phylum: Chordata
- Class: Aves
- Order: Piciformes
- Family: Picidae
- Genus: Pardipicus
- Species: P. caroli

Binomial name
- Pardipicus caroli (Malherbe, 1852)
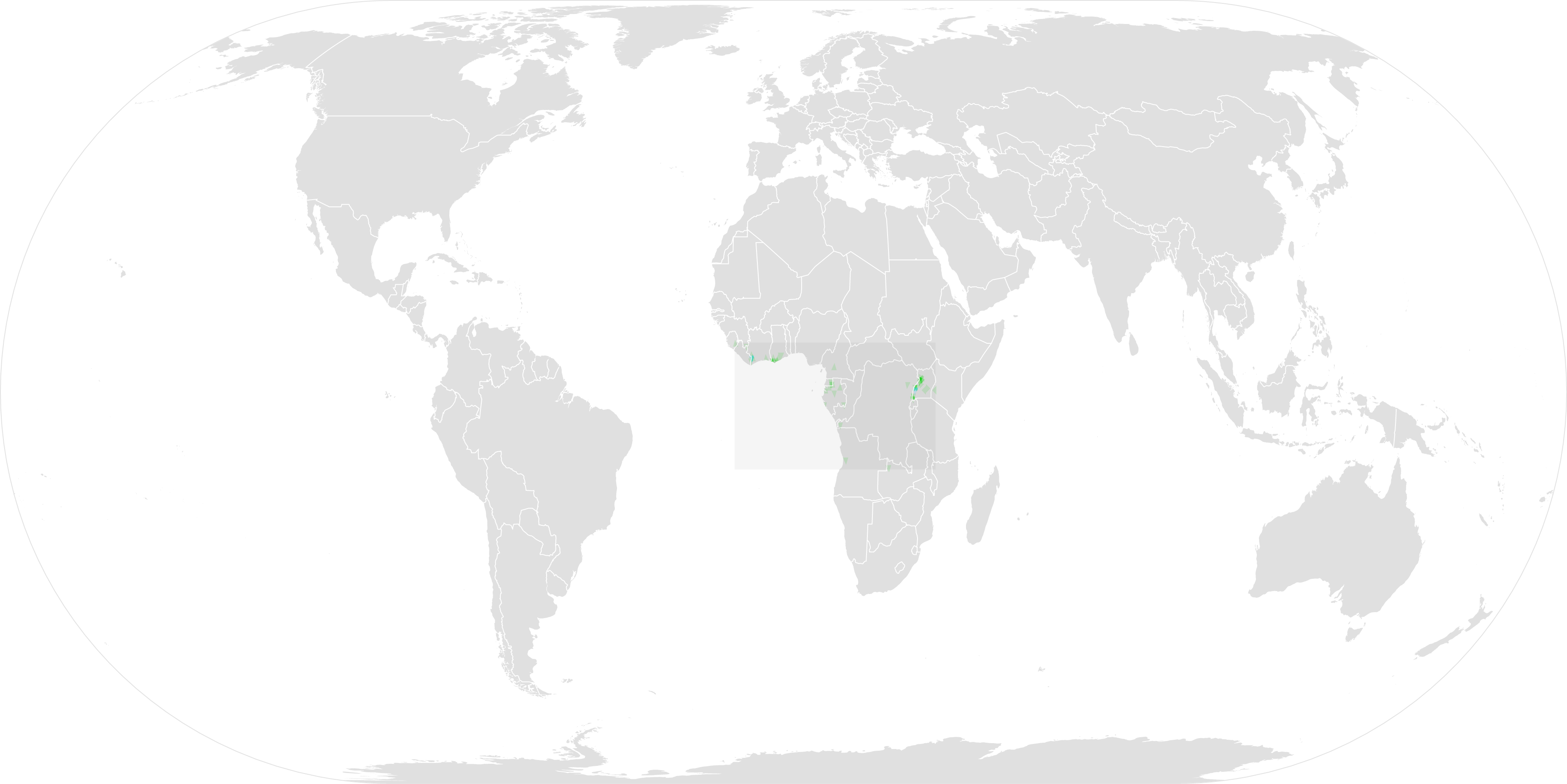
- Distribution of reports to eBird Year-Round Range Summer Range Winter Range

Synonyms
- Campethera caroli

= Brown-eared woodpecker =

Species of bird

The brown-eared woodpecker (Pardipicus caroli) is a species of bird in the family Picidae. It is native to the African tropical rainforest. There are two subspecies; P. c. caroli in the eastern part of its range and P. c. arizela, present from Guinea-Bissau in the west to Nigeria in the east. This bird has a wide range and is a common species in some areas, and the International Union for Conservation of Nature has rated its conservation status as being of "least concern".

== Description ==
The male brown-eared woodpecker has a dark brown fore-crown and red hind-crown, while the female lacks the red colour. In other respects, the sexes are similar. There is a buff supercilium and a large patch of rufous-brown behind the eye and over the ear coverts. The mantle back and wings are olive-brown, and the tail is deep brown with white speckling on the outer feathers. The face and throat are olive-green speckled with white, and the breast and belly are olive green streaked with buff, yellow or white. The long beak is bluish-grey, the legs are olive and the iris chestnut.

== Distribution and habitat ==
The brown-eared woodpecker is found in Angola, Cameroon, Central African Republic, Republic of the Congo, Democratic Republic of the Congo, Ivory Coast, Equatorial Guinea, Gabon, Ghana, Guinea, Guinea-Bissau, Kenya, Liberia, Nigeria, Sierra Leone, South Sudan, Tanzania, Uganda, and Zambia. It is a bird of dense tropical forest, both primary and secondary, with dangling vines and thick regrowth. It also occurs in plantations, riverine forests and more open locations with grassy woodland. It is a rather shy bird, and forages for ants and other small invertebrates among the vines and undergrowth.
