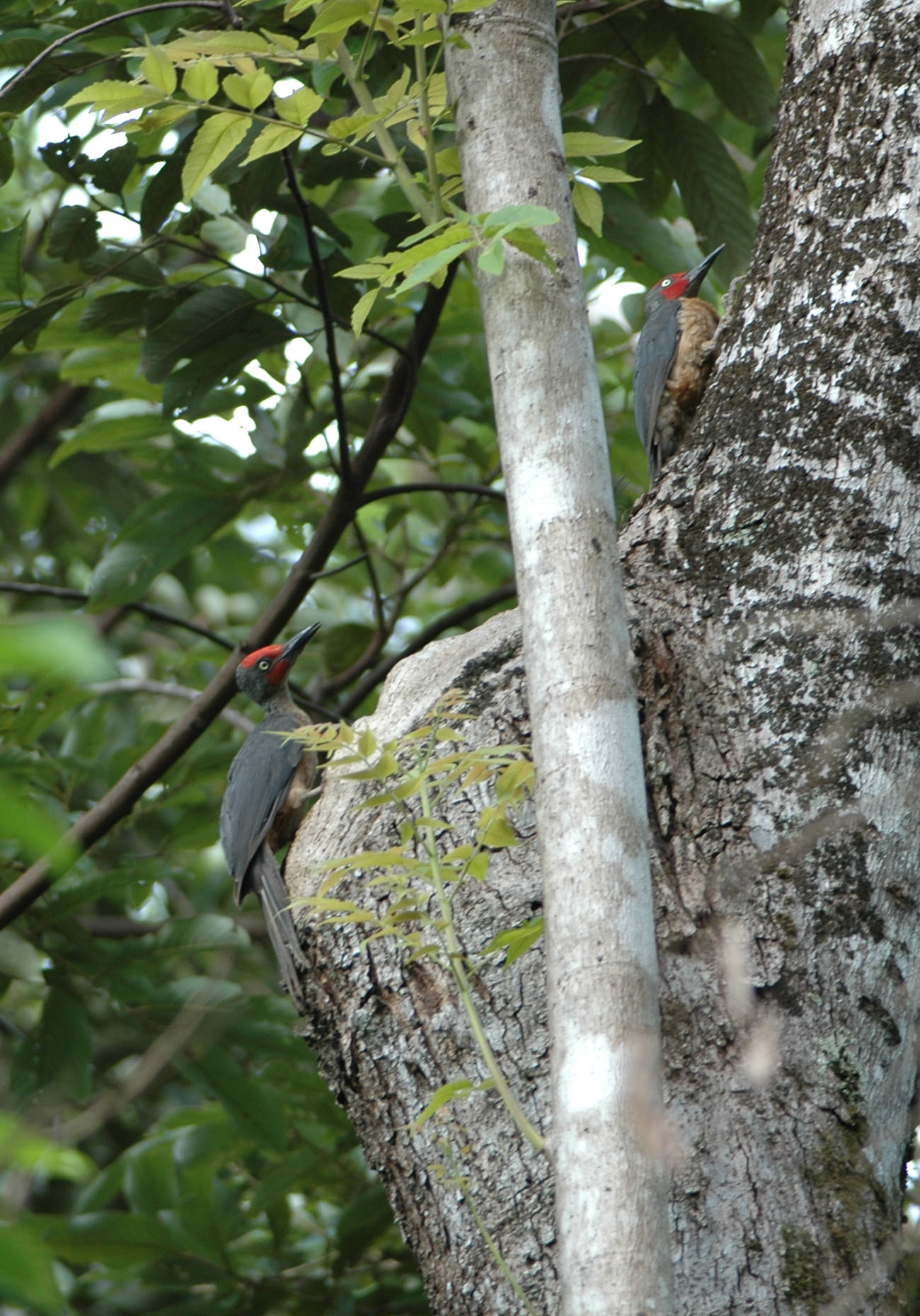
- A pair of ashy woodpeckers (Mulleripicus fulvus)

Scientific classification
- Kingdom: Animalia
- Phylum: Chordata
- Class: Aves
- Order: Piciformes
- Family: Picidae
- Tribe: Picini
- Genus: Mulleripicus; Bonaparte, 1854

Type species
- Picus pulverulentus Temminck, 1826

Species
- see text

= Mulleripicus =

Genus of birds

Mulleripicus is a genus of birds in the woodpecker family Picidae. They are found in South and Southeast Asia. The genus forms part of the woodpecker subfamily Picinae and has a sister relationship to the genus Dryocopus whose species are widely distributed in Eurasia and the Americas.

== Taxonomy ==
The genus Mulleripicus was erected by the French naturalist Charles Lucien Bonaparte to accommodate the great slaty woodpecker (Mulleripicus pulverulentus). The genus name honours the German naturalist Salomon Müller, The genus belongs to the tribe Picini and is a member of a clade that contains the five genera: Colaptes, Piculus, Mulleripicus, Dryocopus and Celeus.

The genus contains four species.

Genus 'Mulleripicus – Bonaparte, 1854 – four species
Common name	Scientific name and subspecies	Range	Size and ecology	IUCN status and estimated population
Ashy woodpecker Male Female	Mulleripicus fulvus (Quoy & Gaimard, 1832)	Sulawesi and surrounding islands in Indonesia	Size: Habitat: Diet:	LC
Northern sooty woodpecker	Mulleripicus funebris (Valenciennes, 1826)	Luzon, Marinduque, Catanduanes and the Polillo Islands in the Philippines	Size: Habitat: Diet:	NT
Southern sooty woodpecker	Mulleripicus fuliginosus Tweeddale, 1877	Mindanao, Leyte, and Samar	Size: Habitat: Diet:	VU
Great slaty woodpecker	Mulleripicus pulverulentus (Temminck, 1826)	Bangladesh, Bhutan, Brunei, Cambodia, India, Indonesia, Laos, Malaysia, Myanmar, Nepal, the Philippines, Singapore, Thailand and Vietnam	Size: Habitat: Diet:	VU
