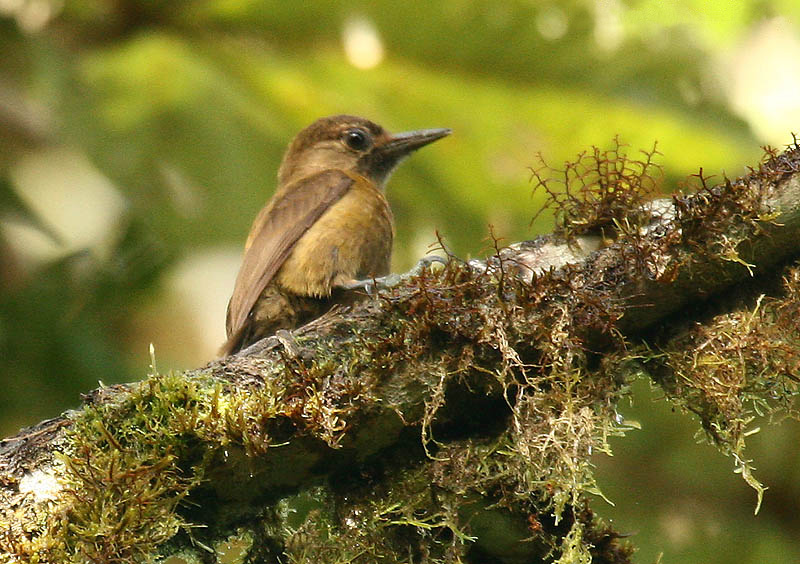
- Female in NW Ecuador

Conservation status
- Least Concern (IUCN 3.1)

Scientific classification
- Kingdom: Animalia
- Phylum: Chordata
- Class: Aves
- Order: Piciformes
- Family: Picidae
- Genus: Leuconotopicus
- Species: L. fumigatus

Binomial name
- Leuconotopicus fumigatus (D'Orbigny, 1840)

Subspecies
- see text

Synonyms
- Veniliornis fumigatus Picoides fumigatus Dryobates fumigatus

= Smoky-brown woodpecker =

Species of bird

The smoky-brown woodpecker (Leuconotopicus fumigatus) is a species of bird in subfamily Picinae of the woodpecker family Picidae. It is found in Argentina, Belize, Bolivia, Colombia, Costa Rica, Ecuador, El Salvador, Guatemala, Honduras, Mexico, Nicaragua, Panama, Peru, and Venezuela.

== Taxonomy and systematics ==
The species was first described by the French naturalist Alcide d'Orbigny as Picus fumigatus, based on individuals observed in the Province of Corrientes in Argentina, and later in Santa Cruz de la Sierra in Bolivia.

Since its original description it has successively been placed in genus Leuconotopicus and Picoides and then returned to Leuconopticus. The International Ornithological Committee and BirdLife International's Handbook of the Birds of the World retain it in that genus. However, starting in 2018, the American Ornithological Society and the Clements taxonomy moved all species of genus Leuconotopicus into genus Dryobates.

The genus name Leuconotopicus derives from the Ancient Greek leukos (white), noton (back) and pikos (woodpecker). The specific epithet fumigatus is Latin for smoked.

The taxonomic systems recognize these five subspecies:

- L. f. oleagineus (Reichenbach, 1854)
- L. f. sanguinolentus (Sclater, P.L., 1859)
- L. f. reichenbachi (Cabanis & Heine, 1863)
- L. f. fumigatus (D'Orbigny, 1840)
- L. f. obscuratus (Chapman, 1927)

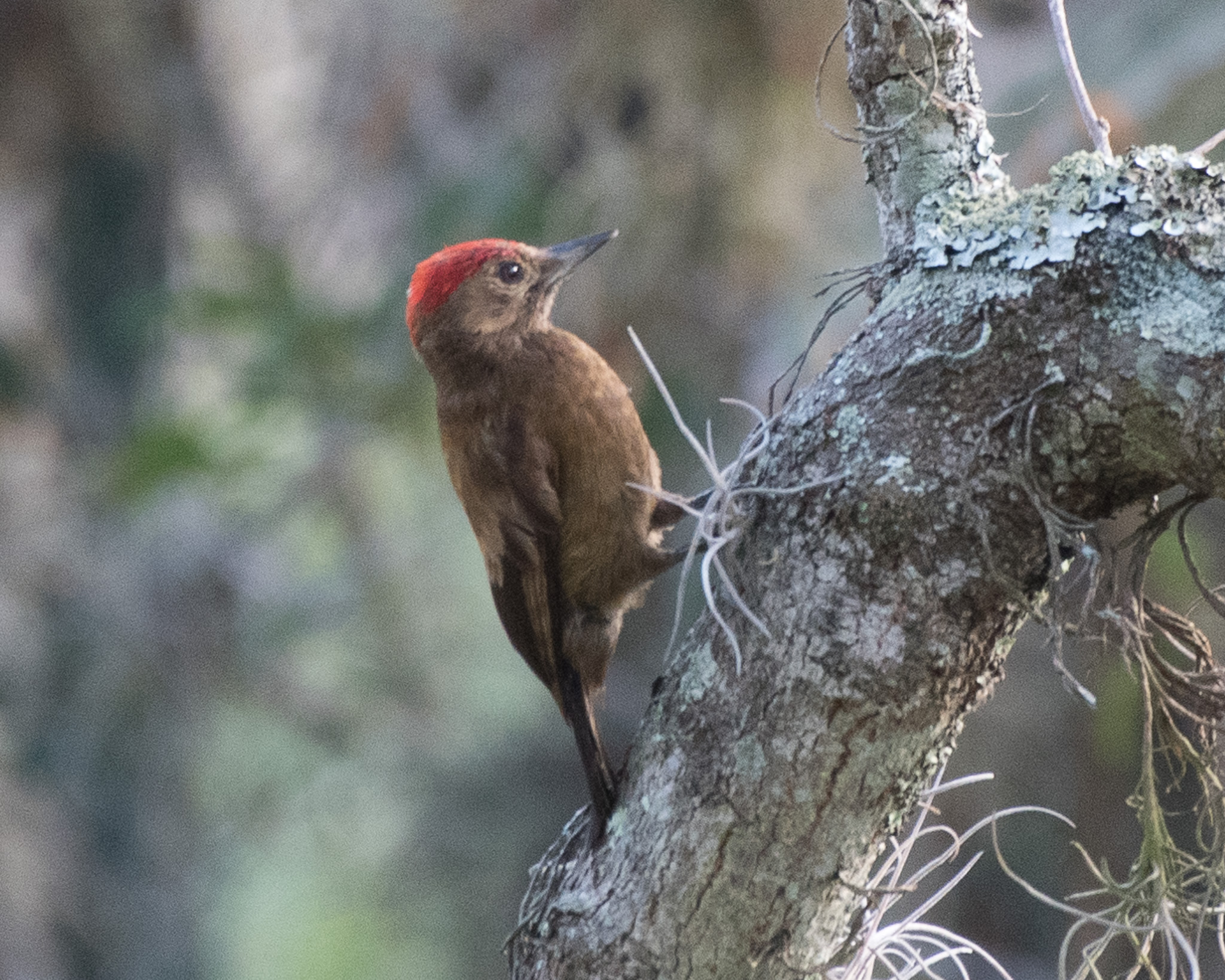
Male in Colombia

== Description ==
The smoky-brown woodpecker is about 18 cm (7.1 in) long and weighs 31 to 50 g (1.1 to 1.8 oz). Males and females have the same plumage except on their heads. Males are red from forehead to nape with dark feather bases showing through. The female's forehead to nape is dark brown with an olive tinge and occasionally some white speckles. Adults of both sexes of the nominate subspecies fumigatus have a mostly olive-brown face with whitish lores, a thin white supercilium, and a black "moustache" with a thin white line above it. Their upperparts are mostly brown to olive-brown with a red tinge on the shoulders and duller brown rump and uppertail coverts. Their flight feathers are dark brown with pale bars on the inner webs. Their tail is blackish brown that is paler on the outer feathers. Their underparts are olive-brown that sometimes is paler on the belly with faint darker bars. Their longish beak is blackish with a paler mandible, their iris deep brown to red-brown, and the legs grayish. Juveniles are duller and more sooty brown than adults, without the red tinge on the back, and with white bars on some flight feathers. Males have a dull red crown and females a dull red forehead.

Subspecies oleagineus has longer wings than the nominate and much white around the eyes. Subspecies sanguinolentus is smaller and has shorter wings than oleagineus; it is a richer brown than the nominate and has a paler face and no white around the eye. Subspecies reichenbachi is similar to sanguinolentus but is a duller brown and has slightly longer wings. Subspecies obscuratus has the longest wings of all subspecies. It is otherwise similar to sanguinolentus but has darker and more gray-brown plumage.

== Distribution and habitat ==
The subspecies of smoky-brown woodpecker are found thus:

- L. (or D.) f. oleagineus, southwestern and eastern Mexico
- L. (or D.) f. sanguinolentus, from southern Mexico to western Panama
- L. (or D.) f. reichenbachi, northern and northeastern Venezuela
- L. (or D.) f. fumigatus, from eastern Panama through Colombia east into northwestern Venezuela and south through Ecuador and eastern Peru into western Bolivia and northwestern Argentina
- L. (or D.) f. obscuratus, southwestern Ecuador and northwestern Peru

The smoky-brown woodpecker inhabits a wide variety of landscapes, most of them wooded. These include humid and wet forest, cloudforest, dry montane and alder woodlands, gallery forest, and secondary forest. It also occurs in the dense understory at the edges of forest and in coffee plantations. In elevation it ranges from near sea level to 1,500 m (4,900 ft) in Mexico, to 750 m (2,500 ft) and locally to 1,850 m (6,100 ft) in Central America, between 800 and 2,700 m (2,600 and 8,900 ft) in Venezuela, mostly between 1,200 and 2,800 m (3,900 and 9,200 ft) in Colombia and Peru, mostly between 1,000 and 1,800 m (3,300 and 5,900 ft) in Ecuador, and between 1,200 and 2,500 m (3,900 and 8,200 ft) in Argentina.

== Behavior ==
=== Movement ===
The smoky-brown woodpecker is a year-round resident throughout its range.

=== Feeding ===
The smoky-brown woodpecker forages singly, in pairs, or in family groups, and often joins mixed species feeding flocks. Most of its diet is adult and larval wood-boring beetles but includes small amounts of fruit. It usually hunts the middle and low levels of the forest, often in dense foliage and vine tangles, but will feed in the canopy and at isolated trees. It mostly finds its prey by pecking and hammering but infrequently probes or gleans.

=== Breeding ===
The smoky-brown woodpecker's breeding season varies geographically, being February to June in Central America, February and March in Venezuela, and October to April in Colombia. Both sexes excavate the nest cavity, usually in a dead branch or trunk or sometimes in a fence post, and typically between 1.5 and 8 m (5 and 25 ft) above the ground. The clutch size is four eggs. The incubation period, time to fledging, and details of parental care are not known.

=== Vocal and non-vocal sounds ===
The smoky-brown woodpecker has a wide variety of vocalizations including "'wick', 'chuk', 'pwik' or 'quip'", a "high-pitched and piping 'keer-keer-keer-keer'", a "hard, rolling, gravelly 'zur-zur-zur-zur', a "tchk, tchk zr-r-r-r uh kuh-kuh-kuh-kuh", and a "queaky, sucking 'wick-a wick-a' or 'tsewink tsewink' in interactions." Its drumming is "very rapid, protracted tattoos."

== Status ==
The IUCN has assessed the smoky-brown woodpecker as being of Least Concern. It has a very large range and an estimated population of at least 50,000 mature individuals, though the latter is believed to be decreasing. No immediate threats have been identified. It is considered uncommon to common in various parts of its range and occurs in many protected areas. "Probably reasonably secure."
