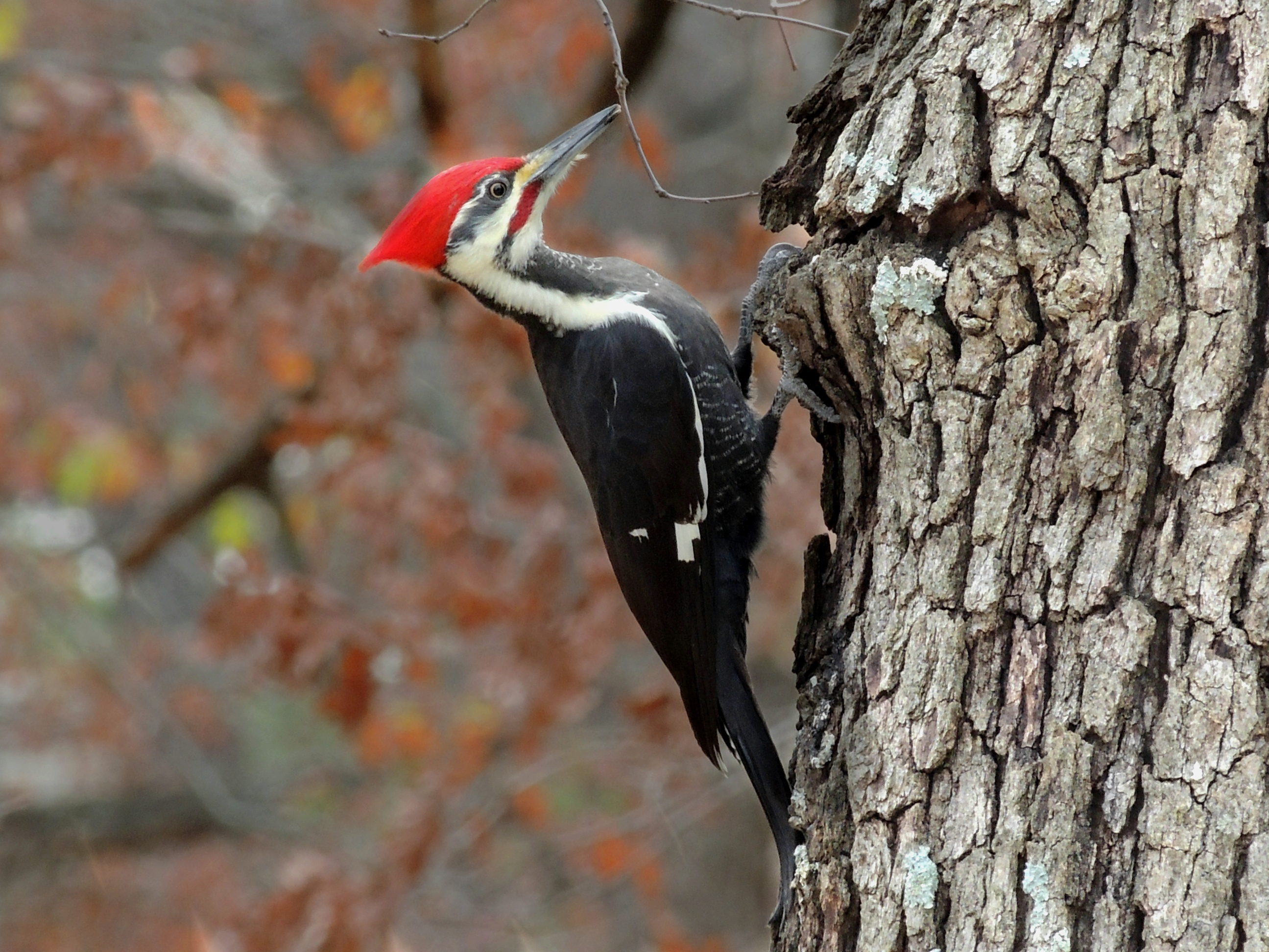
- Pileated woodpecker

Scientific classification
- Kingdom: Animalia
- Phylum: Chordata
- Class: Aves
- Order: Piciformes
- Family: Picidae
- Tribe: Picini
- Genus: Dryocopus; F. Boie, 1826

Type species
- Picus martius Linnaeus, 1758

Species
- See text.

Synonyms
- Hylatomus

= Dryocopus =

Dryocopus Temporal range: Pleistocene-recent

Genus of birds

Dryocopus is a genus of large powerful woodpeckers, typically 35–45 cm in length. It has representatives in North and South America, Europe, and Asia; some South American species are endangered. It was believed to be closely related to the American genus Campephilus, but it is part of a different lineage of woodpeckers altogether (Benz et al., 2006)

Their breeding habitat is forested areas with large trees, where they nest in a large cavity in a dead tree or a dead part of a tree. They may excavate a new hole each year, creating habitat for other large cavity nesting birds. They are non-migratory permanent residents.

They are mainly black in plumage with red on the crown of the head, often as a crest. Most species also have some white areas of plumage, especially on the head, and some have additional red facial markings. The male, female and juvenile plumages of each species usually differ, often in the extent of red on the crown and elsewhere on the head. The flight is strong and direct, and the calls are typically loud wild laughs. The drumming of these large birds can be heard from a great distance.

Dryocopus woodpeckers chip out large holes with their strong bills while searching out insects, especially beetle larvae in trees. They will also take fruits, berries, and nuts.

== Taxonomy ==
The genus Dryocopus was introduced by the German naturalist Friedrich Boie in 1826. The name is from the Ancient Greek word for a woodpecker druokopos combining druos "tree" and kopos "beating". The genus forms part of the woodpecker subfamily Picinae and has a sister relationship to the genus Mulleripicus whose species are found in South and Southeast Asia. The genus Dryocopus is a member of the tribe Picini and belongs to a clade that contains five genera: Colaptes, Piculus, Mulleripicus, Dryocopus and Celeus.

The genus contains six species.

Genus Dryocopus – F. Boie, 1826 – six species
Common name	Scientific name and subspecies	Range	Size and ecology	IUCN status and estimated population
Lineated woodpecker	Dryocopus lineatus (Linnaeus, 1766) Five subspecies: D. l. scapularis – (Vigors, 1829); D. l. similis – (Lesson, 1847); D. l. lineatus – (Linnaeus, 1766); D. l. fuscipennis – (P. L. Sclater, 1860); D. l. erythrops – (Valenciennes, 1826)	Mexico south to northern Argentina and Trinidad	Size: Habitat: Diet:	LC
Pileated woodpecker	Dryocopus pileatus (Linnaeus, 1758) Two subspecies: D. p. abieticola (Bangs, 1898); D. p. pileatus (Linnaeus, 1758)	Eastern North America, the Great Lakes, the boreal forests of Canada, and parts of the Pacific Coast	Size: Habitat: Diet:	LC
Black-bodied woodpecker	Dryocopus schulzii (Cabanis, 1882)	Argentina, Bolivia, and Paraguay	Size: Habitat: Diet:	NT
White-bellied woodpecker	Dryocopus javensis (Horsfield, 1821) Fourteen subspecies: D. j. javensis (Horsfield, 1821); D. j. philippinensis (Steere, 1890); D. j. cebuensis Kennedy, 1987; D. j. confusus (Stresemann, 1913); D. j. feddeni (Blyth, 1863); D. j. forresti Rothschild, 1922; D. j. hargitti (Sharpe, 1884); D. j. hodgsonii (Jerdon, 1840); D. j. mindorensis (Steere, 1890); D. j. multilunatus (McGregor, 1907); D. j. parvus (Richmond, 1902); D. j. pectoralis (Tweeddale, 1878); D. j. richardsi (Tristram, 1879); D. j. suluensis (W. Blasius, 1890)	The Indian subcontinent and Southeast Asia	Size: Habitat: Diet:	LC
Andaman woodpecker	Dryocopus hodgei (Blyth, 1860)	The Andaman Islands in India	Size: Habitat: Diet:	VU
Black woodpecker	Dryocopus martius (Linnaeus, 1758) Two subspecies: D. m. martius (Linnaeus, 1758); D. m. khamensis (Buturlin, 1908	Span across the whole of Europe, excluding the United Kingdom, Ireland, and northern Scandinavia as well as across northern Asia	Size: Habitat: Diet:	LC

== Sources ==
- Benz, Brett W.; Robbins, Mark B.; Peterson, A. Townsend (2006). "Evolutionary history of woodpeckers and allies (Aves: Picidae): Placing key taxa on the phylogenetic tree". Molecular Phylogenetics and Evolution. 40 (2): 389–399. Bibcode:2006MolPE..40..389B. doi:10.1016/j.ympev.2006.02.021. PMID 16635580.
- Gorman, Gerard (2004): Woodpeckers of Europe: A Study of the European Picidae. Bruce Coleman, UK. ISBN 1-872842-05-4.
- Gorman, Gerard (2011): The Black Woodpecker: A monograph on Dryocopus martius. Lynx Edicions, Barcelona. ISBN 978-84-96553-79-8.
- Grimmett, Richard; Inskipp, Carol & Inskipp, Tim (1999): Birds of India, Pakistan, Nepal, Bangladesh, Bhutan, Sri Lanka, and the Maldives. Princeton University Press, Princeton, N.J.. ISBN 0-691-04910-6
