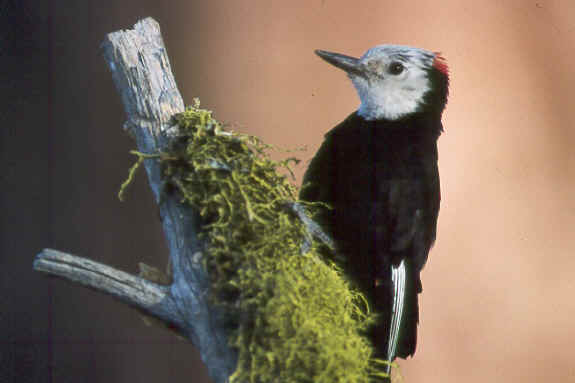
- White-headed woodpecker (Leuconotopicus albolarvatus)

Scientific classification
- Kingdom: Animalia
- Phylum: Chordata
- Class: Aves
- Order: Piciformes
- Family: Picidae
- Tribe: Melanerpini
- Genus: Leuconotopicus; Malherbe, 1845

Species
- See text

= Leuconotopicus =

Genus of birds

Leuconotopicus is a genus of woodpeckers in the family Picidae native to North and South America.

== Taxonomy ==
The genus was erected by the French ornithologist Alfred Malherbe in 1845 with Strickland's woodpecker (Leuconotopicus stricklandi) as the type species. The name Leuconotopicus combines the Ancient Greek leukos meaning "white", nōton meaning "back" and pikos meaning "woodpecker". The genus is sister to the genus Veniliornis and is one of eight genera placed in the tribe Melanerpini within the woodpecker subfamily Picinae. The species now placed in this genus were previously assigned to Picoides.

The genus contains the following six species:

Genus Leuconotopicus – Malherbe, 1845 – six species
Common name	Scientific name and subspecies	Range	Size and ecology	IUCN status and estimated population
Red-cockaded woodpecker Male Female	Leuconotopicus borealis (Vieillot, 1809)	southeastern United States from Florida to Virginia, as far west as eastern Texas and Oklahoma; formerly Kentucky, Maryland, Missouri, New Jersey, and Tennessee	Size: Habitat: Diet:	NT
Smoky-brown woodpecker Male Female	Leuconotopicus fumigatus (D'Orbigny, 1840) Five subspecies: L. f. oleagineus (Reichenbach, 1854); L. f. sanguinolentus (Sclater, P.L., 1859); L. f. reichenbachi (Cabanis & Heine, 1863); L. f. fumigatus (D'Orbigny, 1840); L. f. obscuratus (Chapman, 1927)	Argentina, Belize, Bolivia, Colombia, Costa Rica, Ecuador, El Salvador, Guatemala, Honduras, Mexico, Nicaragua, Panama, Peru, and Venezuela	Size: Habitat: Diet:	LC
Arizona woodpecker Male Female	Leuconotopicus arizonae (Hargitt, 1886)	southern Arizona and New Mexico and the Sierra Madre Occidental of western Mexico	Size: Habitat: Diet:	LC
Strickland's woodpecker	Leuconotopicus stricklandi (Malherbe, 1845)	Mexico	Size: Habitat: Diet:	LC
Hairy woodpecker Male Female	Leuconotopicus villosus (Linnaeus, 1766) Seventeen subspecies: L. v. septentrionalis (Nuttall, 1840); L. v. picoideus (Osgood, 1901); L. v. harrisi (Audubon, 1838); L. v. terraenovae (Batchelder, 1908); L. v. villosus (Linnaeus, 1766); L. v. orius (Oberholser, 1911); L. v. monticola (Anthony, 1898); L. v. leucothorectis (Oberholser, 1911); L. v. audubonii (Swainson, 1832); L. v. hyloscopus (Cabanis & Heine, 1863); L. v. icastus (Oberholser, 1911); L. v. intermedius (Nelson, 1900); L. v. jardinii Malherbe, 1845; L. v. sanctorum (Nelson, 1897); L. v. extimus (Bangs, 1902); L. v. piger (Allen, GM, 1905); L. v. maynardi (Ridgway, 1887)	Bahamas, Canada, Costa Rica, El Salvador, Guatemala, Honduras, Mexico, Nicaragua, Panama, Saint Pierre and Miquelon, and the United States; vagrant to Puerto Rico, Turks and Caicos Islands	Size: Habitat: Diet:	LC
White-headed woodpecker Male Female	Leuconotopicus albolarvatus (Cassin, 1850) Two subspecies: L. a. albolarvatus (Cassin, 1850) Common white-headed woodpecker; L. a. gravirostris (Grinnell, 1902) Southern white-headed woodpecker	British Columbia through southern California	Size: Habitat: Diet:	LC
