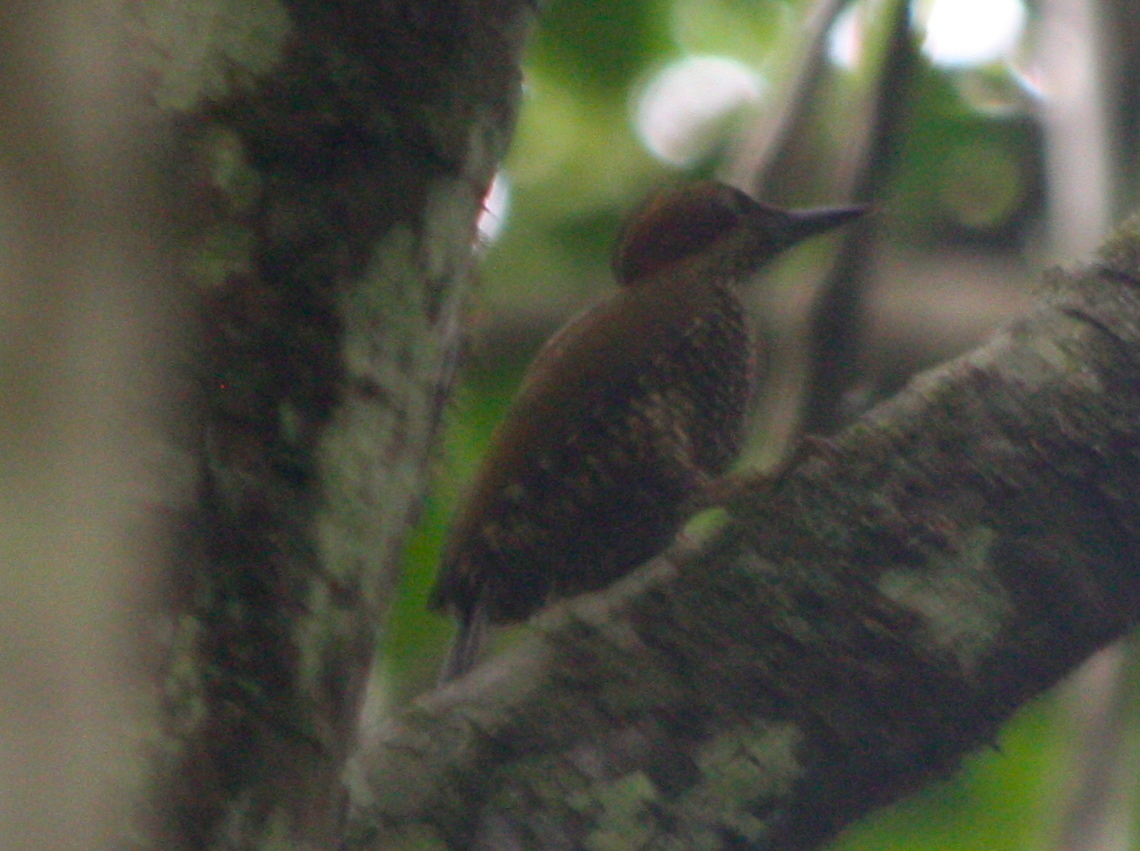
- Brown-eared woodpecker (Pardipicus caroli)

Scientific classification
- Kingdom: Animalia
- Phylum: Chordata
- Class: Aves
- Order: Piciformes
- Family: Picidae
- Tribe: Picini
- Genus: Pardipicus; Bonaparte, 1854

Species
- see text

= Pardipicus =

Genus of birds

Pardipicus is a genus of bird in the family Picidae, or woodpeckers, that are native to the African tropical rainforest. Most species are native to woodland and savanna rather than deep forest, and multiple species exhibit either arboreal or terrestrial foraging strategies.

Image	Common name	Scientific name	Distribution
	Buff-spotted woodpecker	Pardipicus nivosus	Angola, Cameroon, Central African Republic, Republic of the Congo, Democratic Republic of the Congo, Ivory Coast, Equatorial Guinea, Gabon, Gambia, Ghana, Guinea, Guinea-Bissau, Kenya, Liberia, Mali, Mauritania, Nigeria, Rwanda, Senegal, Sierra Leone, South Sudan, Tanzania, Togo, and Uganda.
	Brown-eared woodpecker	Pardipicus caroli	Angola, Cameroon, Central African Republic, Republic of the Congo, Democratic Republic of the Congo, Ivory Coast, Equatorial Guinea, Gabon, Ghana, Guinea, Guinea-Bissau, Kenya, Liberia, Nigeria, Sierra Leone, South Sudan, Tanzania, Uganda, and Zambia.

== Description ==
They are small to medium-sized woodpeckers. The sexes are fairly similar, but males of most species have the crown and nape bright red, while in females this is restricted to the nape. Colour of the malar plumage is also useful in sexing.

Their plumage pattern is fairly uniform, and some species are only distinguishable by careful observation. The mantle, back and wings are olive-greenish, and usually spotted or barred in buffy to golden yellow. The shafts of the remiges and rectrices are yellow to golden yellow. The underpart plumage is spotted black to a lesser or greater degree.

Some species include drumming on dead wood as a means of non-vocal signaling.

== Foraging ==
Their rectrices are only partially stiffened (for arboreal support), and they readily take to terrestrial foraging. Ants and termites form important components of their diet. These are lapped up with a flexible and sticky tongue.
