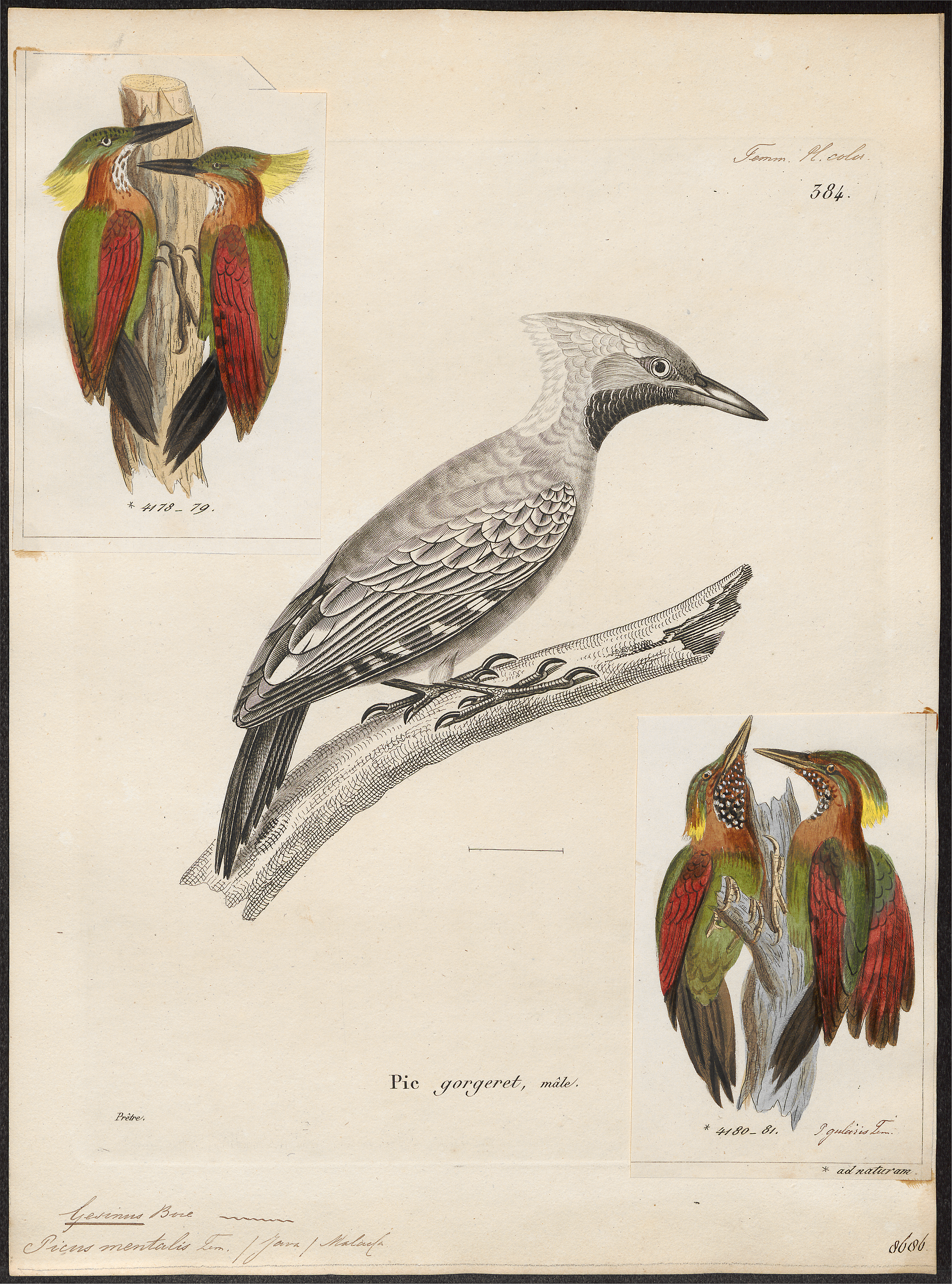

Scientific classification
- Kingdom: Animalia
- Phylum: Chordata
- Class: Aves
- Order: Piciformes
- Family: Picidae
- Tribe: Picini
- Genus: Chrysophlegma; Gould, 1850

Type species
- Picus flavinucha Gould, 1834

Species
- See text

= Chrysophlegma =

Genus of birds

Chrysophlegma is a genus of birds in the woodpeckers family Picidae. These species, found in South and Southeast Asia, were all previously assigned to the genus Picus.

== Taxonomy ==
The species now placed in Chrysophlegma were previously assigned to the genus Picus. A molecular phylogenetic study published in 2008 found that the genus Picus, as then defined, formed two separate clades and might not be monophyletic. Three species were therefore moved from Picus into the resurrected genus Chrysophlegma, which had been introduced in 1850 by the English ornithologist John Gould to accommodate the greater yellownape (Chrysophlegma flavinucha). The genus name combines the Classical Greek khrusos meaning "gold" and phlegma meaning "flame" or "fire".

The genus contains 3 species.

Image	Scientific name	Common name	Distribution
	Chrysophlegma flavinucha	Greater yellownape	East Asia from northern and eastern India to south-eastern China, Indochina, Hainan, and Sumatra
	Chrysophlegma mentale	Checker-throated woodpecker	Myanmar, Thailand, Malaysia, Singapore, Brunei, and Indonesia.
	Chrysophlegma miniaceum	Banded woodpecker	Brunei, Indonesia, Malaysia, Myanmar, Singapore, and Thailand
