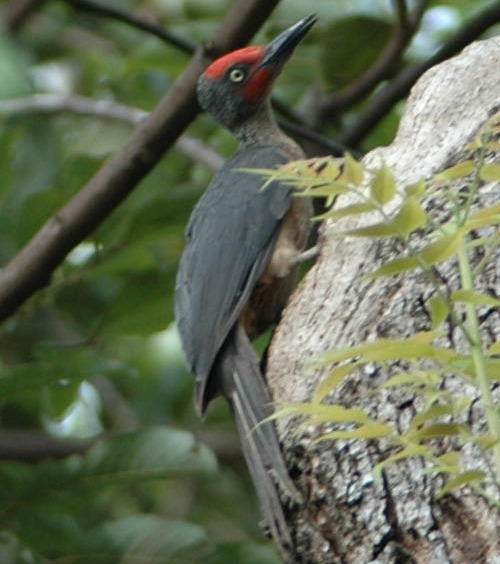
- Male Mulleripicus fulvus fulvus
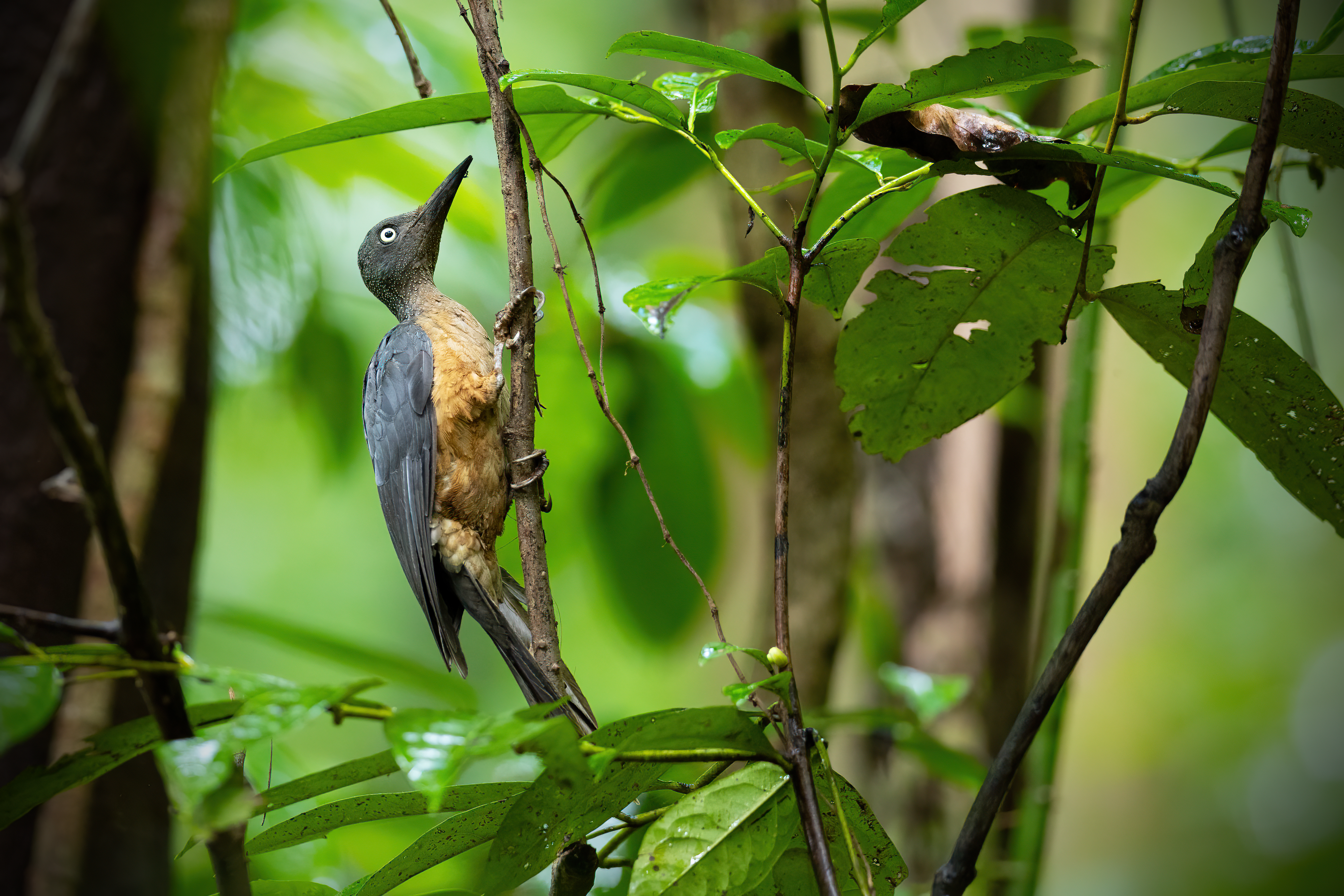
- female

Conservation status
- Least Concern (IUCN 3.1)

Scientific classification
- Kingdom: Animalia
- Phylum: Chordata
- Class: Aves
- Order: Piciformes
- Family: Picidae
- Genus: Mulleripicus
- Species: M. fulvus

Binomial name
- Mulleripicus fulvus (Quoy & Gaimard, 1832)

= Ashy woodpecker =

Species of bird

The ashy woodpecker (Mulleripicus fulvus) is a species of bird in the woodpecker family Picidae. It is endemic to Sulawesi and surrounding islands in Indonesia. There are two subspecies, the nominate race M. f. fulvus, which is found in northern Sulawesi, the islands of Lembeh and Manterawu, and the archipelagos of Togian and Banggai; and M. f. wallacei, from southern Sulawesi and the islands of Muna and Buton. The second subspecies is named after the collector and scientist Alfred Russel Wallace.

Its natural habitats are tropical moist lowland forests and tropical moist montane forests. They prefer closed forest, but can be found in secondary forest and patches of forest in savannah. They are assumed to be non-migratory, and can be found from sea level to 2,000 m (6,600 ft).The species is not uncommon and is considered secure for now.

The ashy woodpecker is a large woodpecker, 40 cm (16 in) in length, though not as large as the related great slaty woodpecker which replaces it from Borneo westwards. The male has a red face to the mid-crown, and the back of the head and neck are grey. The throat, front of the neck and belly are buff-coloured, and the rest of the back and wings are grey-brown to dark slate grey. The long bill is black, and the iris of the eye yellow; the eye is surrounded by a grey eye-ring. The female is like the male but the head is entirely grey, faintly spotted except for the forehead. M. f. wallacei resembles the nominate subspecies, but the red on the face encompasses most of the head. It also has a slightly longer tail and wings, but a slightly shorter bill. The calls include laughing calls of hew-hew-hew-hew-hew and tuk tuk tuk, but these are muffled, not loud. They also drum during the breeding season.

Ashy woodpeckers predominantly feed on trees, but may also break into termite nests on the ground. In trees, they are often seen on trunks. They feed on termites, caterpillars and other insects and arthropods. Little is known about their nesting; one pair was observed digging a nest hole, with the male doing most of the work. Nesting holes are found in dead trees or in the dead sections of living trees. Two to three eggs are laid.
