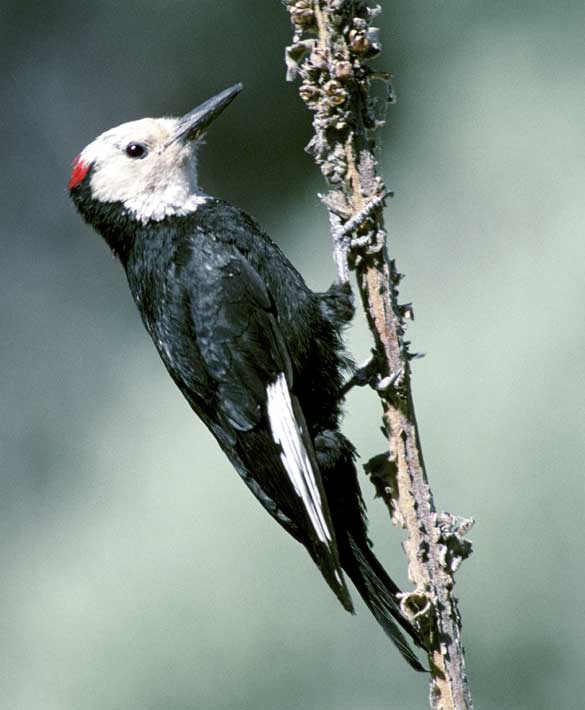
- Male white-headed woodpecker in Deschutes National Forest, Oregon

Conservation status
- Least Concern (IUCN 3.1)

- Apparently Secure (NatureServe)

Scientific classification
- Kingdom: Animalia
- Phylum: Chordata
- Class: Aves
- Order: Piciformes
- Family: Picidae
- Genus: Leuconotopicus
- Species: L. albolarvatus

Binomial name
- Leuconotopicus albolarvatus (Cassin, 1850)

Subspecies
- L. a. albolarvatus (Cassin, 1850) Common white-headed woodpecker; L. a. gravirostris (Grinnell, 1902) Southern white-headed woodpecker
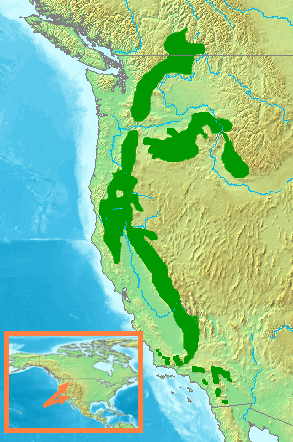
- White-headed woodpecker range

Synonyms
- Picoides albolarvatus Leuconerpes albolarvatus (Cassin, 1850)

= White-headed woodpecker =

Species of bird

The white-headed woodpecker (Leuconotopicus albolarvatus) is a non-migratory woodpecker that resides in pine forests of the mountains of western North America.

== Description ==
It has a black body (approximately 20 cm (7.9 in) long) and white head. It has white primary feathers that form a crescent in flight. Males have a red spot at the back of the head.

== Distribution and habitat ==
The range of the white-headed woodpecker stretches in the mountains from British Columbia through southern California. They form nests in dead trees or snags and reproduce once per year.

== Taxonomy ==
Most of the range is occupied by the nominate subspecies. In the southern part of the range, L. a. gravirostris, which has a longer bill - especially in males - and tail, is only found on mountaintops of the San Gabriel Mountains to San Diego County. Birds on Mount Pinos are somewhat intermediate. mtDNA cytochrome b and ATP synthase subunit 6 sequence data confirms this arrangement and also suggests that the Mount Pinos birds are closer to L. a. gravirostris (Alexander & Burns, 2006). Apparently, the larger bill of the southern subspecies is an adaptation for being better able to feed on the large, spiny cones of Coulter pines (Pinus coulteri). Some taxonomic authorities, including the American Ornithological Society, place this species in the genus Dryobates.

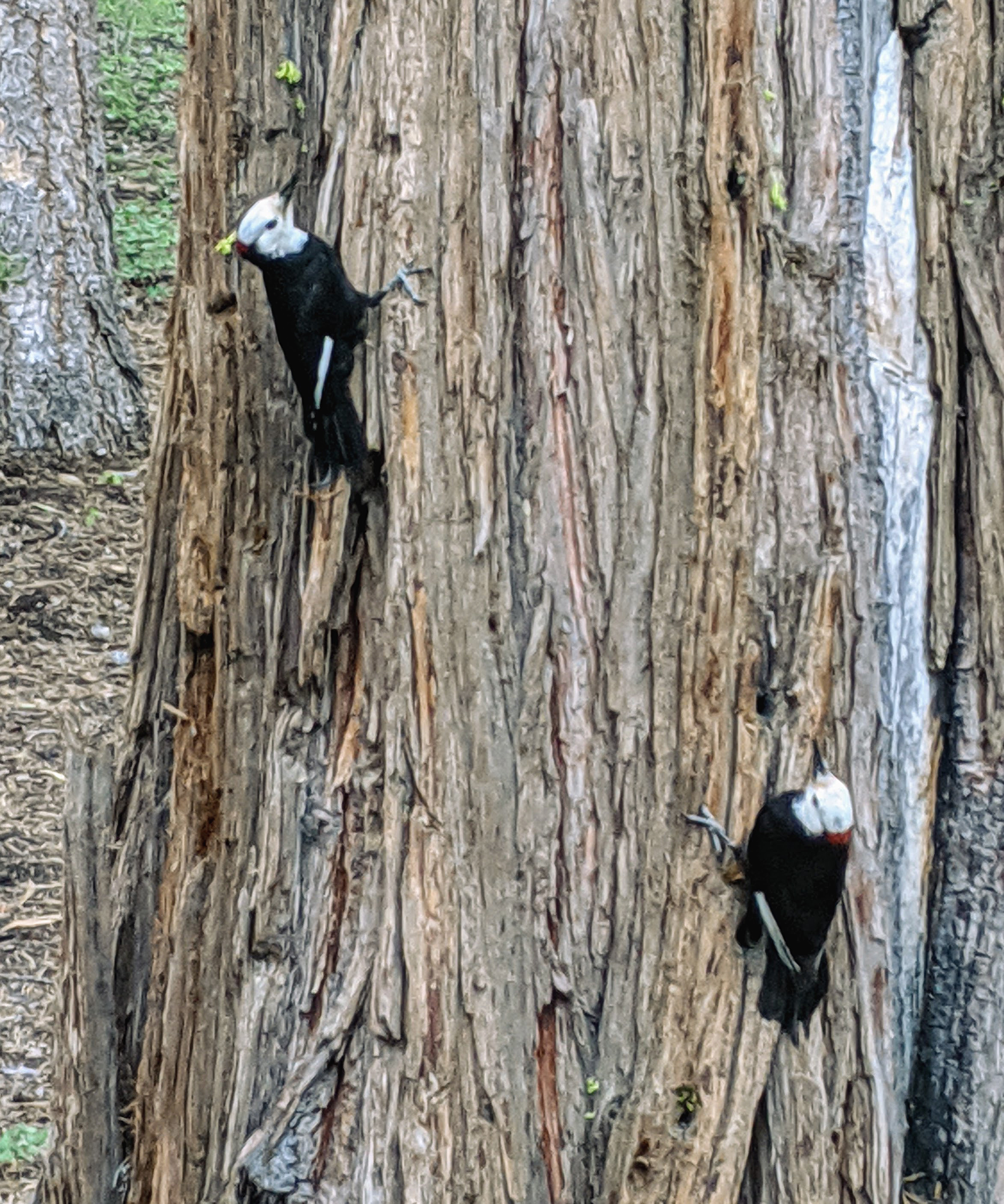
A pair of white-headed woodpeckers playing around a tree near Lake Tahoe
