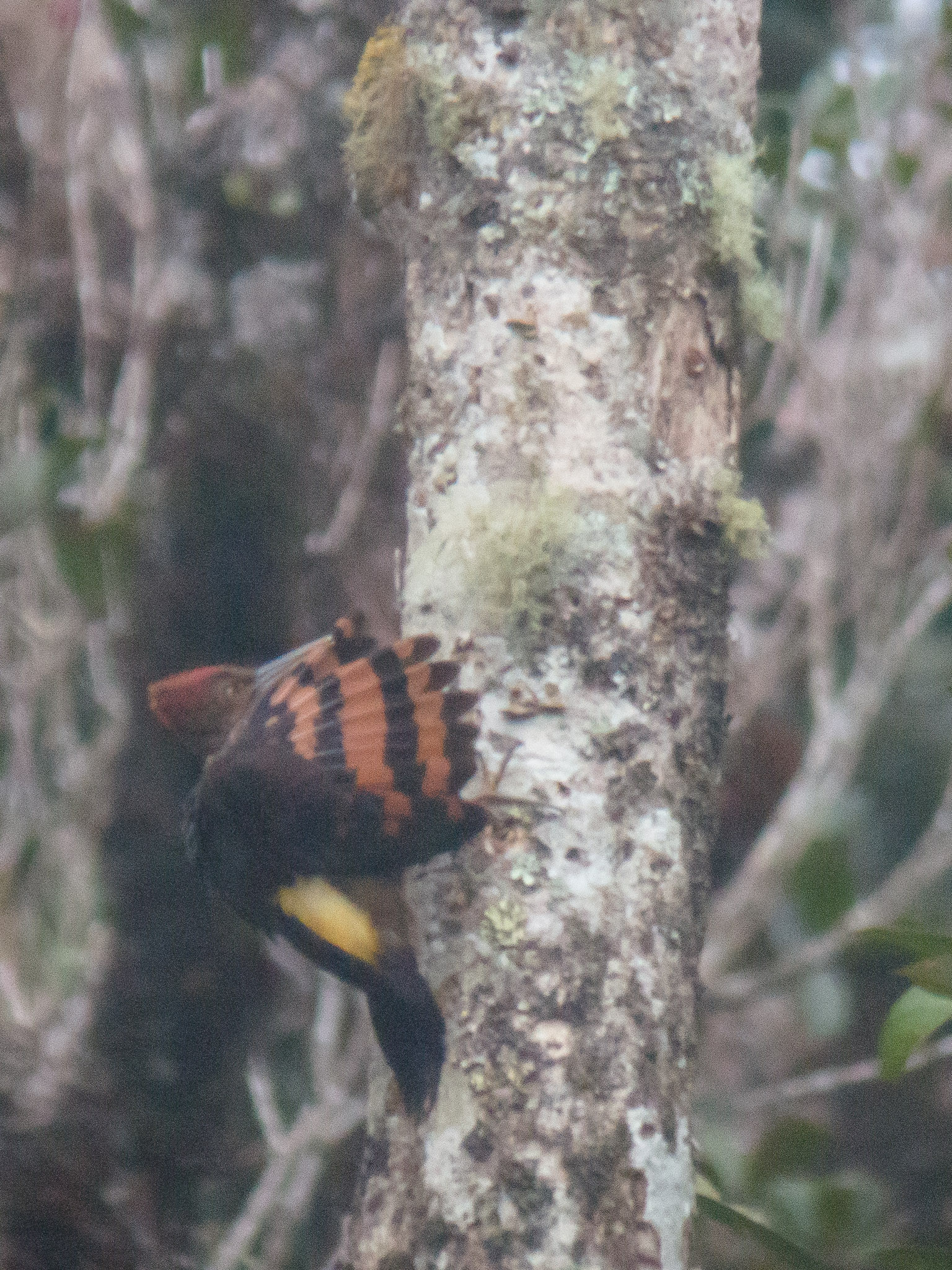

Conservation status
- Least Concern (IUCN 3.1)

Scientific classification
- Kingdom: Animalia
- Phylum: Chordata
- Class: Aves
- Order: Piciformes
- Family: Picidae
- Genus: Chrysocolaptes
- Species: C. validus

Binomial name
- Chrysocolaptes validus (Temminck, 1825)

Synonyms
- Reinwardtipicus validus

= Orange-backed woodpecker =

Species of bird

The orange-backed woodpecker (Chrysocolaptes validus) is a bird in the woodpecker family Picidae, found in southern Thailand, Malaya, Sarawak and Sabah in Malaysia, Brunei, Sumatra, and Java. It is a forest specialist that is found primarily in the canopy.

== Taxonomy ==
The orange-backed woodpecker was described and illustrated in 1825 by Dutch zoologist Coenraad Jacob Temminck in his Nouveau recueil de planches coloriées d'oiseaux from specimens that had been collected on the Indonesian island of Java. He coined the binomial name Pic validus. This species was previously placed in its own genus Reinwardtipicus. It is now one of ten species placed in the genus Chrysocolaptes that was introduced in 1843 by the English zoologist Edward Blyth.

Two subspecies are recognised:

- C. v. xanthopygius (Finsch, 1905) – the Malay Peninsula, Sumatra, and Borneo;
- C. v. validus (Temminck, 1825) – Java.

== Gallery ==
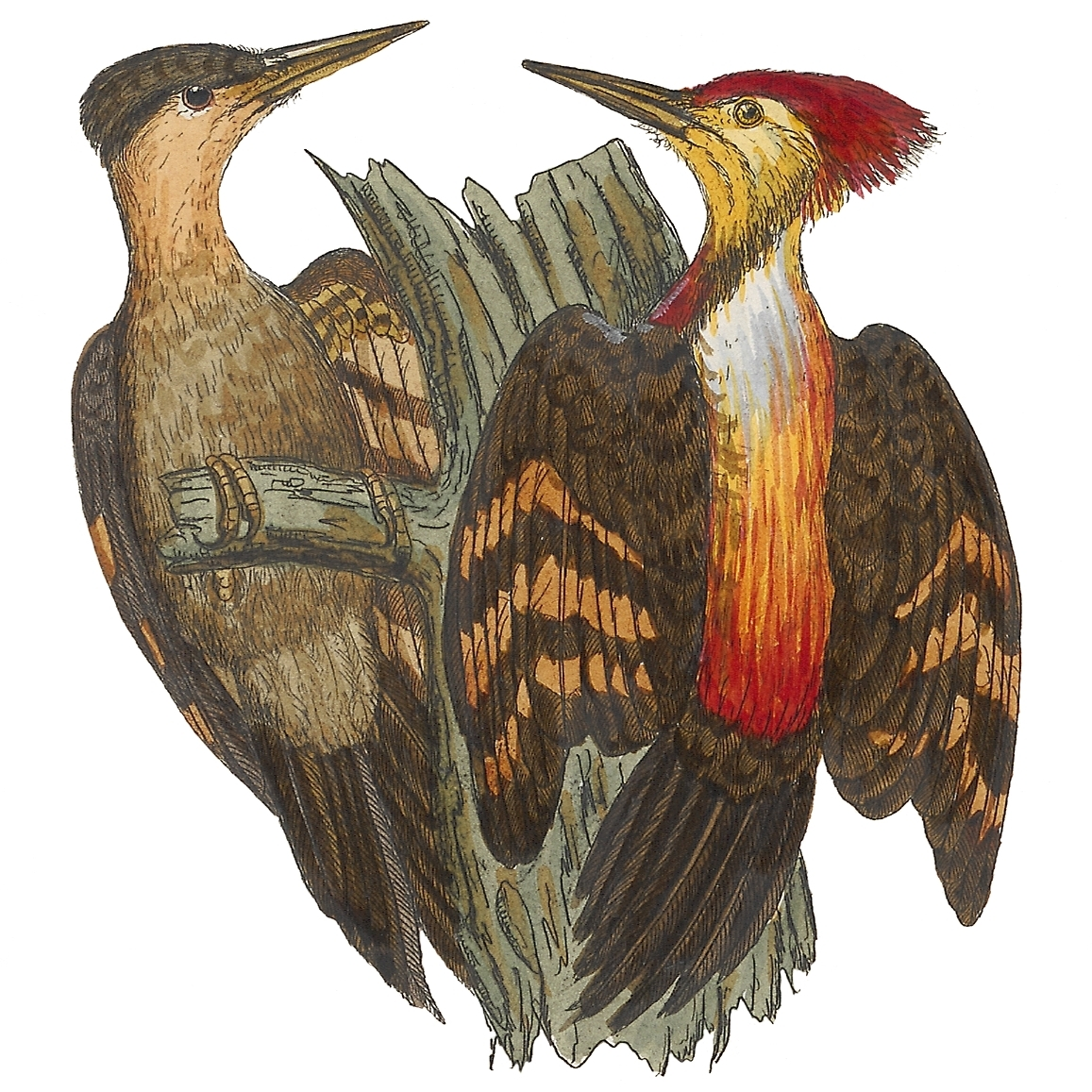
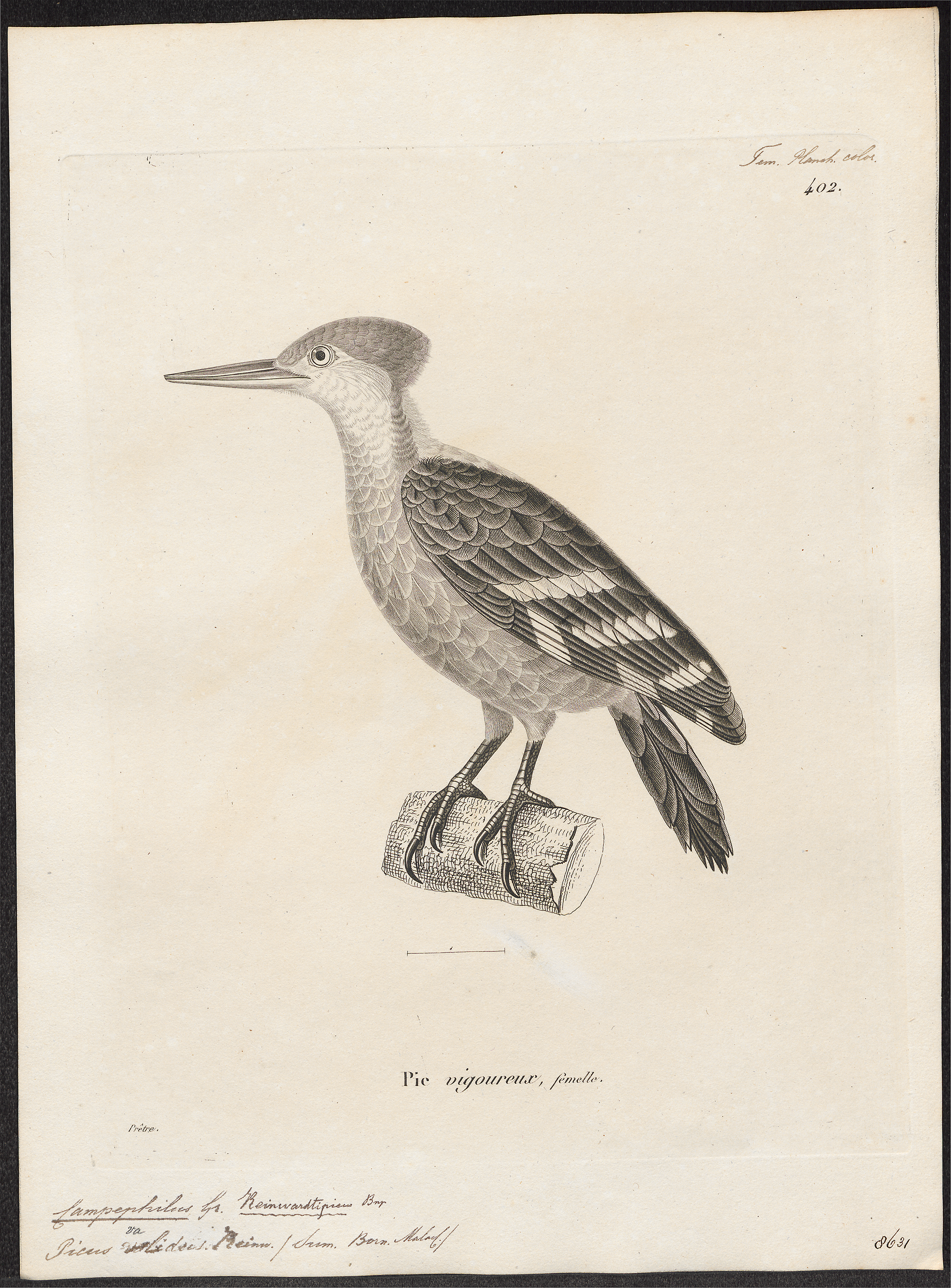
