= Checker-throated woodpecker =

Conservation status
- Near Threatened (IUCN 3.1)

Scientific classification
- Kingdom: Animalia
- Phylum: Chordata
- Class: Aves
- Order: Piciformes
- Family: Picidae
- Genus: Chrysophlegma
- Species: C. mentale

Binomial name
- Chrysophlegma mentale (Temminck, 1826)

Synonyms
- Picus mentalis

Species of bird in the Picidae family

The checker-throated woodpecker, checker-throated yellownape, or Javan yellownape (Chrysophlegma mentale) is a species of bird in the family Picidae native to Southeast Asia.

== Distribution and Population ==
The checker-throated woodpecker has a wide range in Southeast Asia and is known to occur in Myanmar, Thailand, Malaysia, Singapore, Brunei, and Indonesia. Its natural habitat is subtropical or tropical moist lowland or montane forests, and the landward edge of mangrove forests.

== Ecology ==
The species has been recorded as breeding in March and April in Malaysia, and between February and June in Borneo, using nests is excavated in deadwood. It feeds on insects supplemented by berries, foraging by gleaning and probing in the lower and middle canopy storeys.

== Conservation ==
The checker-throated woodpecker is greatly threatened by deforestation caused by illegal logging for primary forest wood and the expansion of palm oil plantations and other agricultural developments, and appears to be declining. It is currently classified as Near threatened by the IUCN.
