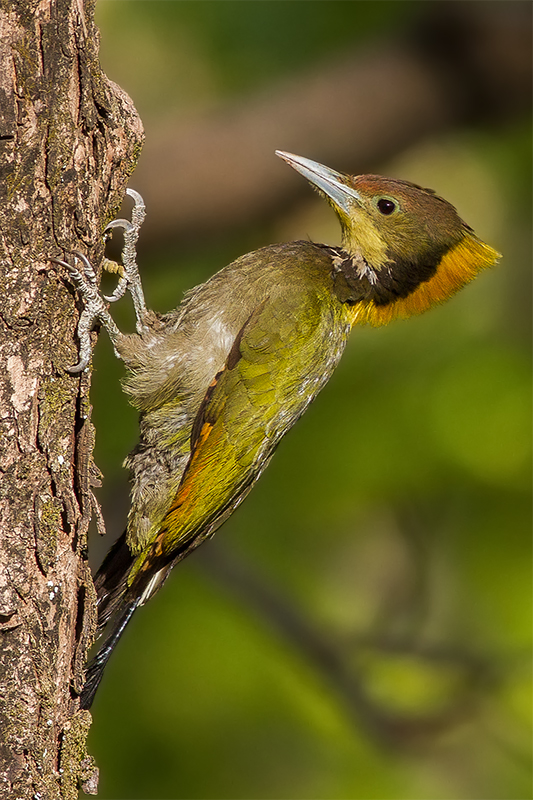
- Male
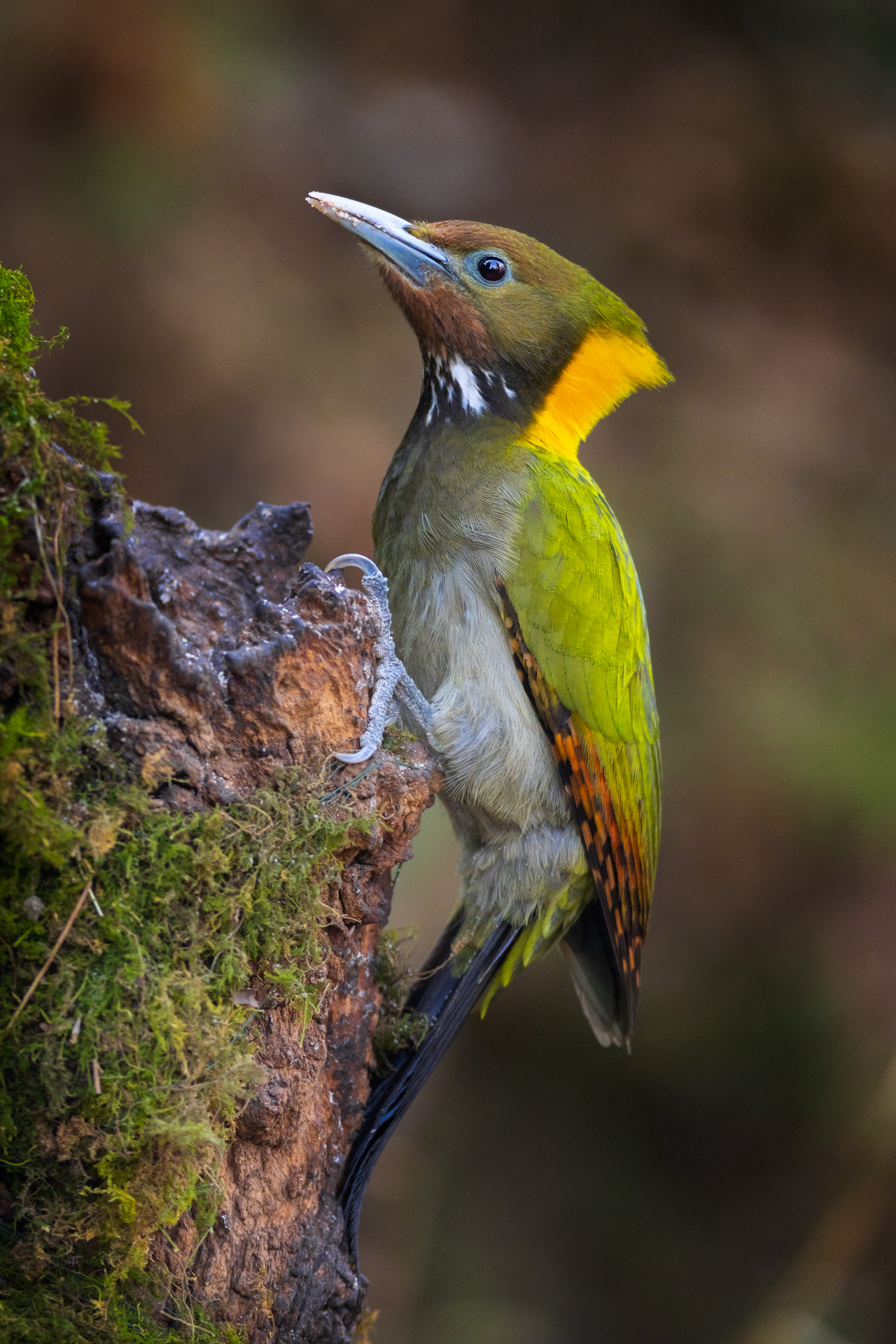
- Female

Conservation status
- Least Concern (IUCN 3.1)

Scientific classification
- Kingdom: Animalia
- Phylum: Chordata
- Class: Aves
- Order: Piciformes
- Family: Picidae
- Genus: Chrysophlegma
- Species: C. flavinucha

Binomial name
- Chrysophlegma flavinucha (Gould, 1834)

Synonyms
- Picus flavinucha

= Greater yellownape =

Species of bird

The greater yellownape (Chrysophlegma flavinucha) is a species of bird in the woodpecker family Picidae.

It is found in East Asia from northern and eastern India to south-eastern China, Indochina, Hainan, and Sumatra. Its natural habitats are subtropical or tropical moist lowland forest and subtropical or tropical moist montane forest.

== Description ==
Large, olive green woodpecker with prominent yellow-crested nape and throat. Dark olive green with grey underparts. Crown brownish and flight feathers chestnut barred with black. Bill often looks whitish.

Male

Female

== Gallery ==
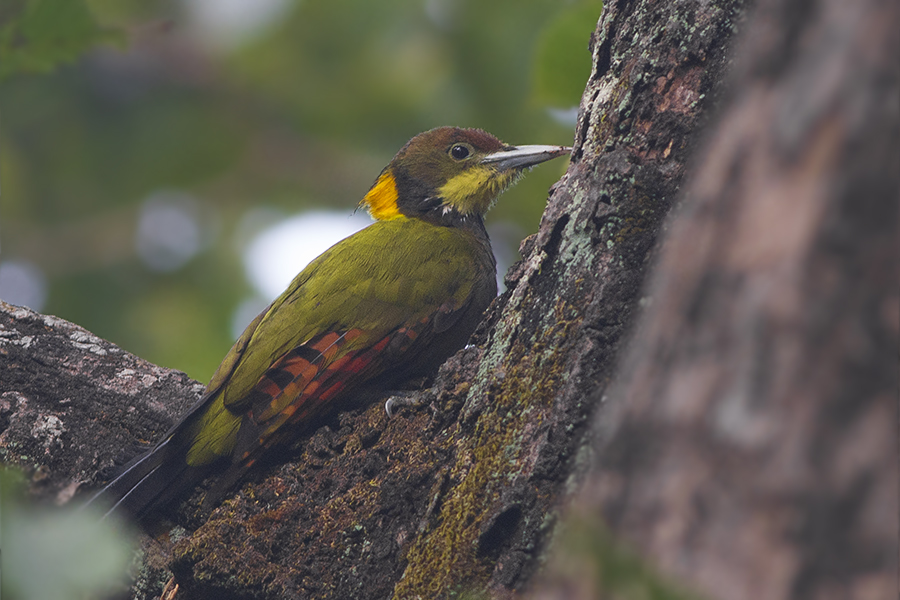
P. f. kumaonense in Uttarakhand, India

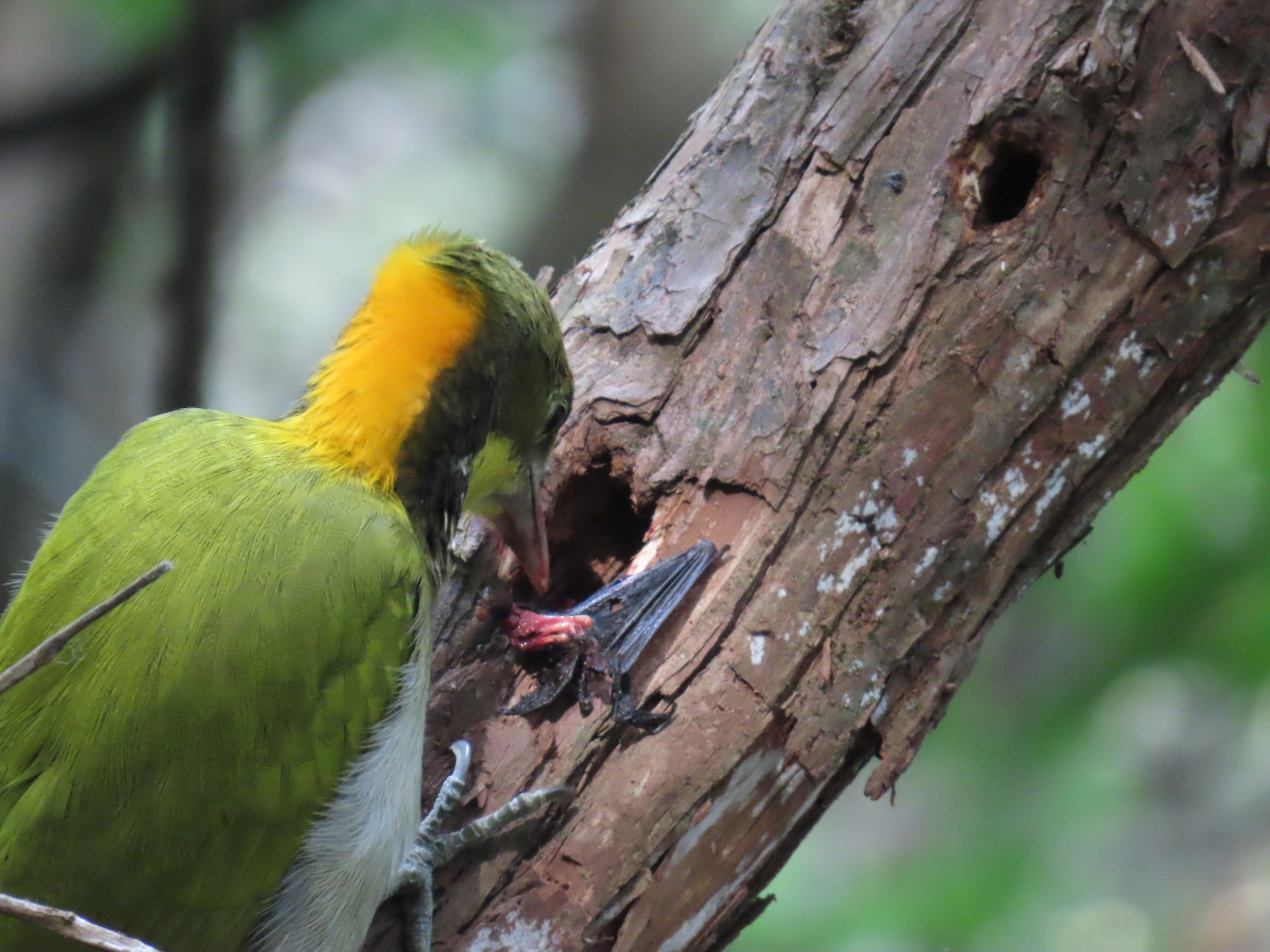
Eating a bat

Greater and lesser yellownape, in India

Male, Sundarbans
