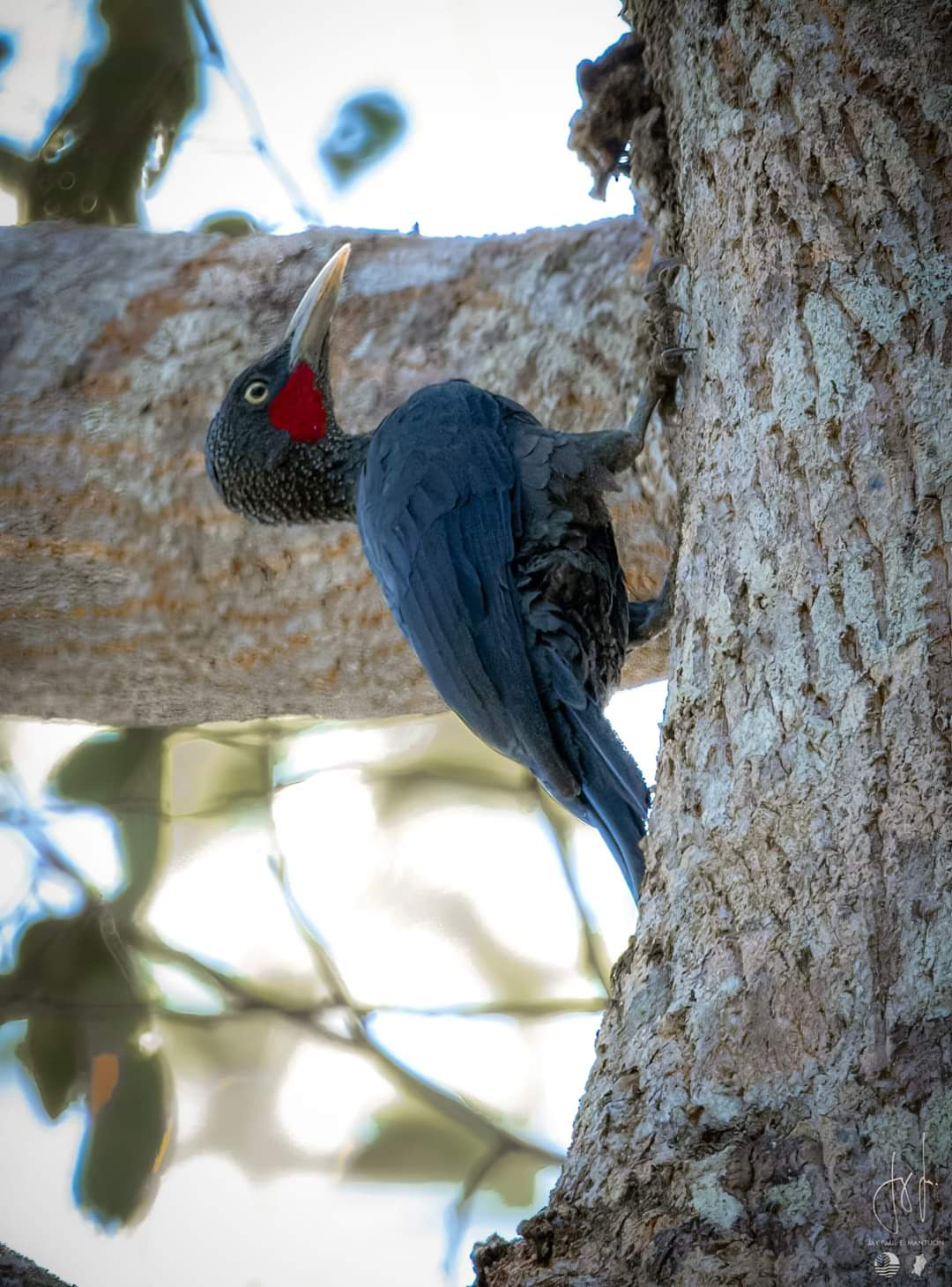
- Male
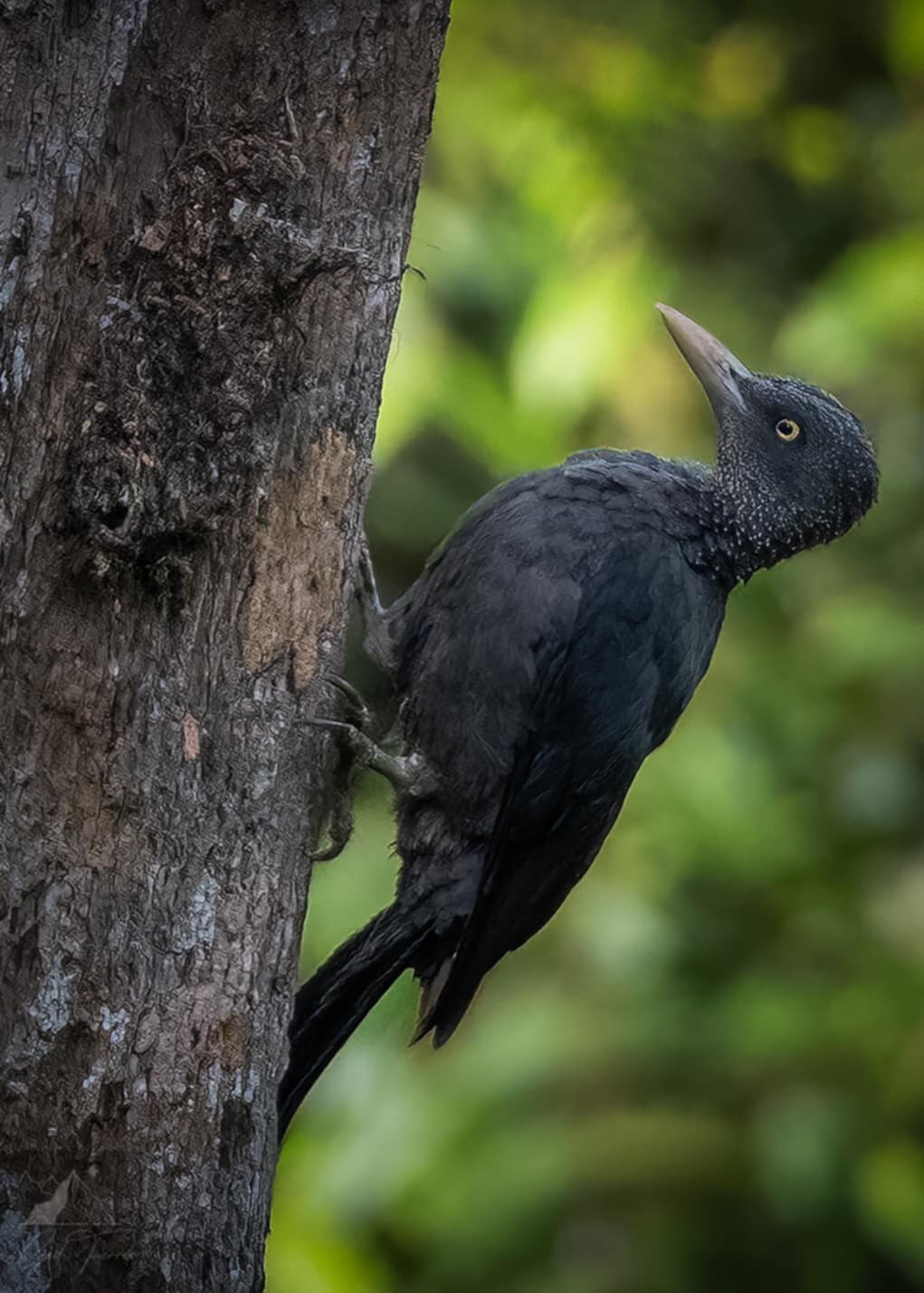
- Female

Conservation status
- Vulnerable (IUCN 3.1)

Scientific classification
- Kingdom: Animalia
- Phylum: Chordata
- Class: Aves
- Order: Piciformes
- Family: Picidae
- Genus: Mulleripicus
- Species: M. fuliginosus

Binomial name
- Mulleripicus fuliginosus Tweeddale, 1877

= Southern sooty woodpecker =

Species of bird

The southern sooty woodpecker (Mulleripicus fuliginosus) is a bird in the family Picidae. It is endemic to the Philippines on the islands of Mindanao, Leyte, and Samar. Its natural habitat is threatened by habitat loss.

== Description and taxonomy ==
This is described as large woodpecker found in the lowland forests of Mindanao and Eastern Visayas. This species is primarily sooty with fine speckling on the head. It has pale eyes and an ivory colored bill. This species exhibits sexual dimorphism in which the male has a bright red mark from the base of the bill to the cheek. Juveniles are slightly more brown with more apparent spotting.

Its voice is described as a high pitched chips and squeaks. It also has a drumroll from pecking wood which is described as a powerful and accelerating series of knocks.

Both the southern sooty woodpecker and the northern sooty woodpecker were previously considered to be subspecies of the same species, Mulleripicus funebris, known simply as the "sooty woodpecker". They were split as distinct species by the IOC in 2021.

The Southern sooty differs from the Northern sooty with its light ashy gray plumage, its white ivory colored bill, the male's bright red mark on its cheek, larger white spots on its neck and face and slightly smaller size in comparison to its Northern counterpart's dark gray plumage and male's burgundy facial markings over its entire face.

This species is monotypic and has no subspecies.

== Ecology and behaviour ==
Not much is known about this species, but it is presumed to feed on invertebrates including larvae feeding on dead wood. It is typically found singly or as a pair. It forages high up on tall trees.

The breeding season is reported as April to August in Samar and Leyte. Like all woodpeckers, this species is a cavity nester. A nest observed in April contained 2 chicks .

== Habitat and conservation status ==
Its natural habitats are at tropical moist lowland primary forest up to 1,000 meters above sea level. They cannot seem to tolerate degraded habitats and secondary forest.

The IUCN Red List has assessed this bird as vulnerable with the population believed to be on the decline. Its main threat is habitat destruction through both legal and Illegal logging, conversion into farmlands through Slash-and-burn, charcoal burning, and mining. Its preference for low altitudes suggests that it must have suffered population losses with the loss of lowland forest in the Philippines.

There are currently no species-specific conservation plans. It occurs in a few protected areas on Pasonanca Natural Park and Samar Island Natural Park. However, as with most areas in the Philippines, protection from hunting and illegal logging is lax.

Conservation actions proposed are surveys to assess the total population size and locate strongholds. Monitor habitat trends. Increase the area of primary forest in the species' range that receives effective protection. Carry out long term habitat restoration with native tree species.
