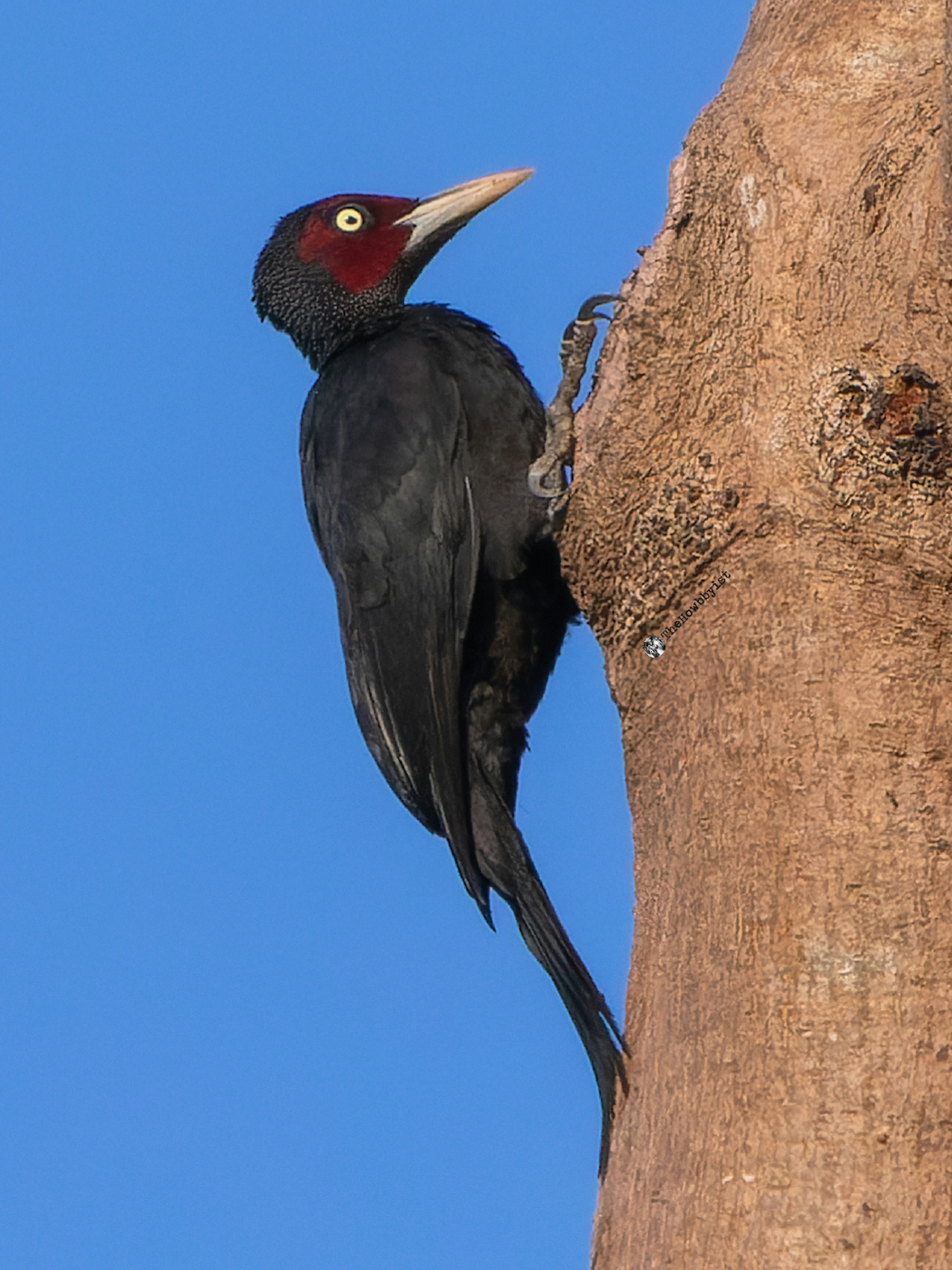
- Male
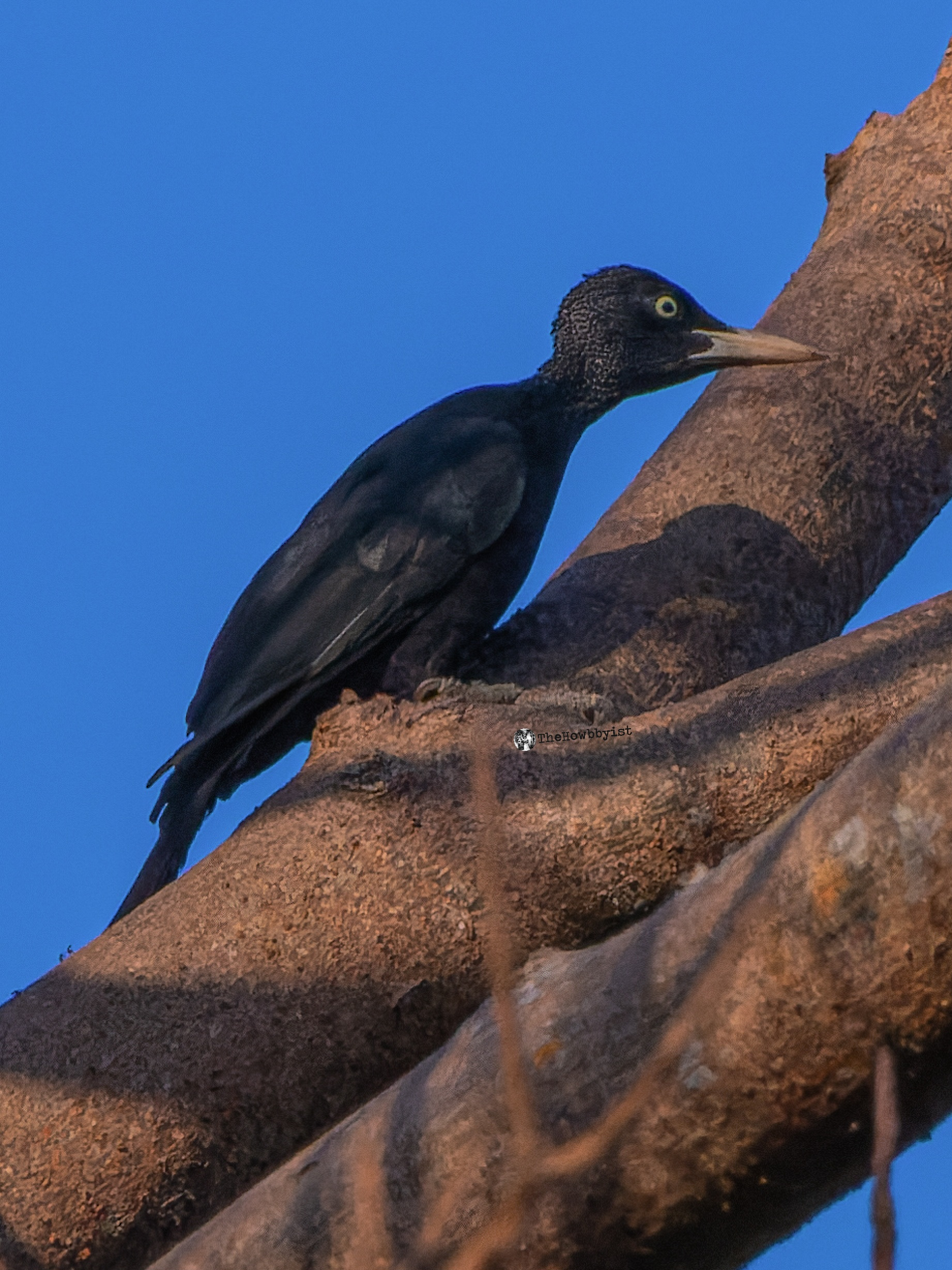
- Female

Conservation status
- Near Threatened (IUCN 3.1)

Scientific classification
- Kingdom: Animalia
- Phylum: Chordata
- Class: Aves
- Order: Piciformes
- Family: Picidae
- Genus: Mulleripicus
- Species: M. funebris

Binomial name
- Mulleripicus funebris (Valenciennes, 1826)

= Northern sooty woodpecker =

Species of bird

The northern sooty woodpecker (Mulleripicus funebris) is a species of bird in the family Picidae. It is endemic to Luzon, Marinduque, Catanduanes and the Polillo Islands in the Philippines. Its natural habitats are tropical moist lowland forests and tropical moist montane forests.

The northern sooty woodpecker was once considered conspecific with the southern sooty woodpecker and both were lumped together as Mulleripicus funebris and known simply as the "sooty woodpecker".

== Description and taxonomy ==
This is described as large woodpecker found in the lowland forests of Luzon. This species is primarily black with fine speckling on the head. It has pale eyes and an yellow bill. This species exhibits sexual dimorphism in which the male has a bright red face. Juveniles are slightly more brown with more apparent spotting.

Its voice is described as a loud whistle like trill. It also has a drumroll from pecking wood which is described as a powerful and accelerating series of knocks.

Both the southern sooty woodpecker and the northern sooty woodpecker were previously considered to be subspecies of the same species, Mulleripicus funebris, known simply as the "sooty woodpecker". They were split as distinct species by the IOC in 2021.

The Northern sooty differs from the Southern sooty with its darker gray plumage, the male's burgundy markings over its entire face, smaller white spots on its neck and face and larger size in comparison to its Southern counterpart's light gray plumage and male's red facial markings over cheek.

=== Subspecies ===
Three subspecies are recognized:

- M. f. funebris – Found on Central and Southern Luzon and Catanduanes
- M. f. parkesi – Found on Polillo Islands; slightly larger, lesser extent of red on face not reaching the forecrown
- M. f. mayri – Found on Northern Luzon; longer bill and tail and yellowish gray bill

Both subspecies are very similar to the nominate and may be synonymized.

== Ecology and behaviour ==
Not much is known about this species, but it is presumed to feed on invertebrates including larvae feeding on dead wood. It is typically found singly or as a pair. It forages high up on tall trees.

The breeding season is reported as March to May and it nests in holes in trees. Not much else is known.

== Habitat and conservation status ==
Found in primary forest, mature secondary forest typically in below 1,000 masl but has been seen as high as 1,600masl. Forages in upper storeys in tall trees but also goes down to the understorey, on tree trunks and large limbs.

IUCN has assessed this bird as a near-threatened species with the population said to be decreasing. This species' main threat is habitat loss.
