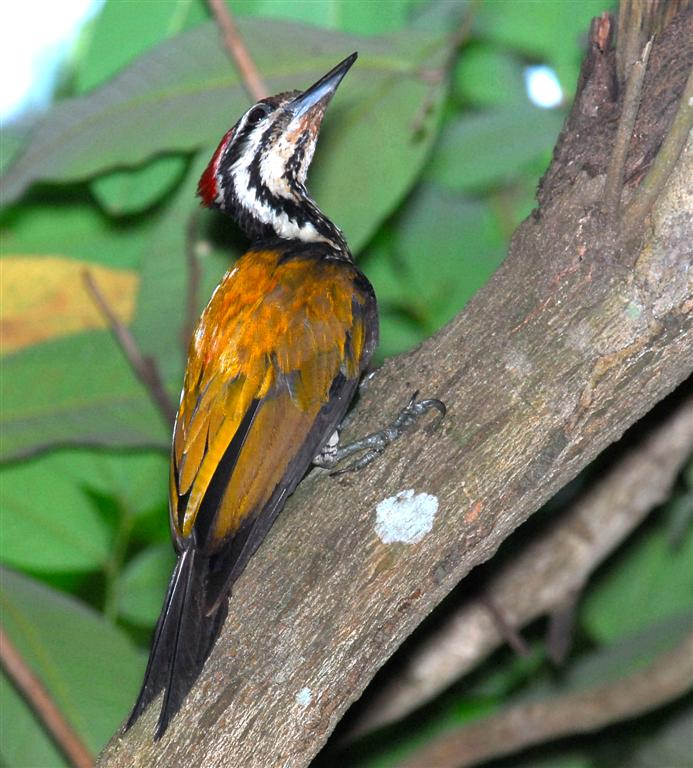
- Common flameback Dinopium javanense

Scientific classification
- Domain: Eukaryota
- Kingdom: Animalia
- Phylum: Chordata
- Class: Aves
- Order: Piciformes
- Family: Picidae
- Subfamily: Picinae

Genera
- Dinopium Rafinesque, 1814; Chrysocolaptes Blyth, 1843

= Flameback =

Woodpecker

The flamebacks or goldenbacks are large woodpeckers which are resident breeders in tropical southern Asia. They derive their English names from their golden or crimson backs.

However, the two flameback genera Dinopium and Chrysocolaptes are not particularly close relatives. The former are close to the enigmatic Meiglyptes and possibly Hemicircus woodpeckers, and the recently reclassified rufous woodpecker (Micropternus brachyurus). Chrysocolaptes on the other hand appears to be a rather close relative of Campephilus, the genus of the famous ivory-billed woodpecker (C. principalis).

Tribe Malarpicini

- Genus Dinopium
  - Himalayan flameback, Dinopium shorii
  - Common flameback, Dinopium javanense
  - Spot-throated flameback, Dinopium everetti
  - Black-rumped flameback, Dinopium benghalense
  - Red-backed flameback, Dinopium psarodes

Tribe Megapicini

- Genus Chrysocolaptes
  - White-naped woodpecker, Chrysocolaptes festivus
  - Greater flameback, Chrysocolaptes guttacristatus
  - Crimson-backed flameback, Chrysocolaptes stricklandi
  - Javan flameback, Chrysocolaptes strictus
  - Luzon flameback, Chrysocolaptes haematribon
  - Yellow-faced flameback, Chrysocolaptes xanthocephalus
  - Buff-spotted flameback, Chrysocolaptes lucidus
  - Red-headed flameback, Chrysocolaptes erythrocephalus
