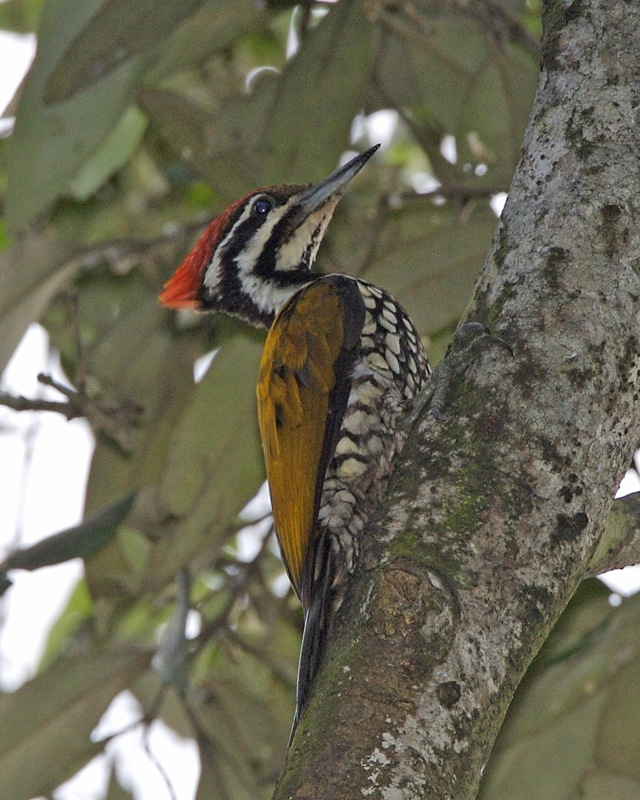
- Male in Singapore
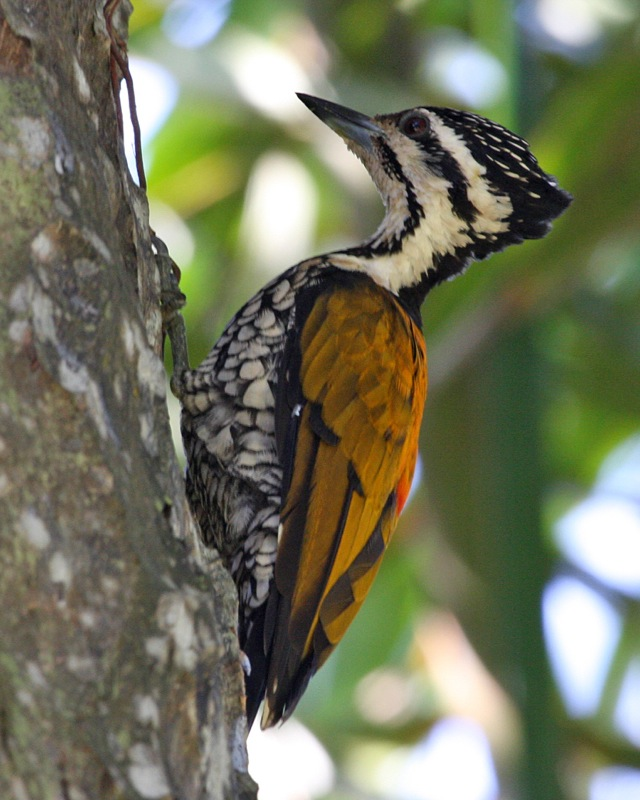
- Female in Singapore

Conservation status
- Least Concern (IUCN 3.1)

Scientific classification
- Kingdom: Animalia
- Phylum: Chordata
- Class: Aves
- Order: Piciformes
- Family: Picidae
- Genus: Dinopium
- Species: D. javanense

Binomial name
- Dinopium javanense (Ljungh, 1797)

= Common flameback =

Species of bird in the Picidae family

The common flameback (Dinopium javanense), also referred to as the common goldenback, is a small (28–30 cm), three-toed woodpecker in the family Picidae, found throughout South and Southeast Asia.

== Taxonomy ==
The common flameback is closely related with almost all members of the Dinopium species, which include 4 other species; the Himalayan flameback (D. shorii), the spot-throated flameback (D. everetti), the black-rumped flameback (D. benghalense), and the red-backed flameback (D. psarodes). The olive-backed woodpecker (Gecinulus rafflesii) was formerly classified in Dinopium but is more closely related to the pale-headed woodpecker (Gecinulus grantia), and was thus reclassified into Gecinulus.

The common flameback is most closely related to the Himalayan flameback and the spot-throated flameback, even being lumped with the spot-throated flameback until recently. These two species differ in the degree of spottiness, as despite their names, the common flameback has a higher degree of spotting on the upper breast than the plain upper breast of spot-throated flameback. Additionally, the common flameback shares a unique morphological feature with two other woodpeckers, this being the highly developed protractor pterygoidei muscle, which is also present in the olive-backed woodpecker and surprisingly, the maroon woodpecker (Blythipicus rubiginosus). Whether this shared morphology is due to species relatedness or convergent evolution is unknown, as the olive-backed woodpecker has been removed from the Dinopium genus and the maroon woodpecker belongs to an entirely different genus but may be closer related to Dinopium than previously thought.

=== Subspecies ===
There are six subspecies currently recognized:

- Dinopium javanense javanense - native to peninsular Thailand south to Sumatra, including Riau Archipelago, and western Java
- Dinopium javanense malabaricum - native to southwest India
- Dinopium javanense intermedium - the largest of the subspecies (weighing 79–100 g) and native to Bangladesh, eastern Myanmar and southern China (southwest Yunnan province)
- Dinopium javanense borneonense - native to Borneo, except for northeast Borneo
- Dinopium javanense raveni - native to northeast Borneo and offshore islets
- Dinopium javanense exsul - native to eastern Java and Bali

== Habitat and distribution ==
As shy and secretive birds, common flamebacks are unlikely to be found in urban areas. They live in a variety of habitats, ranging from moist open forests, to scrubs, and mangroves. Although they generally enjoy lowlands, they can reach altitudes of 1700m above sea level in India and in those cases prefer living in pine forests.

Their distribution ranges across Southeast Asia, from the Western Ghats in India to the Indochinese peninsula and several of the Greater Sunda Islands.

== Description ==
Males and females differ in the crest colour, as males have a bright red crest while females have a black crest with white streaks. Both sexes have a white supercilium, white cheek stripe, and white throat area, all separated by stripes of black, and they have a spotted black and white underside. The bird is distinguishable from other similar golden-backed woodpeckers, such as the greater flameback (Chrysocolaptes guttacristatus), by its smaller bill and black nape, and from the black-rumped flameback by its red rump and white throat. Its loud, high-pitched call, which resembles a series of "kow-kowp" rattles is incredibly similar to the greater flameback's call, and is the best way to distinguish the common flameback from the Himalayan flameback, which is a nearly identical bird.

== Behaviour ==
=== Vocalizations ===
The common flameback is a relatively quiet species, who rarely produces noise despite being able to produce many different sounds. Although it belongs to the woodpecker family, it surprisingly rarely drums on wood, as it has a different foraging behaviour. There have been instances of soft and low nest drumming, during which the male softly tapped his nest with his beak while also raising his crest. This action may be in response to the researcher's persistent presence near the nest, as the drum timing and low level of aggression does not point to it being a mating display.

The common flameback has a variety of different vocalizations it makes. The first notable one being the "wicka call", which lasts about four seconds in duration and can be uttered by one or both of the birds in a pair. It consists of three kinds of notes; a vertical, inverted U-shaped note, a slow dropping note, and a short, inverted V-shaped note. Another vocalization is the "kow call", which consists of a single or double, non-harmonic note. The "kowp call" appears to be a more complex version of the "kow call", as it consists of a variety of modified or unmodified "kow call" notes. This call is mainly heard while the bird is taking of, flying, or landing, which indicates that this is an alarm call to warn other birds of a potential threat. The final call is the "rattle call", which is usually heard following the "kowp call". It is a call with varying length, consisting of a fast series of 17-57 notes lasting anywhere from 0.72 to 2.56 seconds.

=== Diet and foraging behaviours ===
The foraging methods of the common flameback are diverse, but generally there is little to no "wood pecking" involved. There has been evidence of them hammering at young trees to shed the bark, however this action is rarely observed. As their beak is relatively small, they are more adapted to a gleaning and probing foraging method, which produces no noise by the species. Their movements are abrupt, as they remain motionless and quiet for long periods of time before lurching and rapidly pecking at passing insects. As strict insectivores, their main diet consists of mainly ants as those are the most prevalent, however they are known to hawk slow-flying insects out of the air and glean other tree-crawling invertebrates. The odd foot morphology allows them to hop quickly and effectively, as their three toes allow for a large range of movement. As they hop around the trees, they maintain two toes in front and one in the back, however, when they are resting they group all three toes together in the front. Additionally, the sexes usually forage on different trees, maintaining vocal and visual contact. If one bird lands near another, they move apart to opposite sides of the tree and display some "peeking" behaviour, as well as some crest raising, which is observed in both sexes.

=== Reproduction ===
There is a limited amount of information on the reproduction and mating of the common flameback. Some accounts describe that there are no displays during copulation, other than a raised crest from the male as he mounts the female. Other accounts state that there is a short mating display, which consists of crest-raising from both sexes, bowing movements, head swinging, and even males courtship feeding the females. They nest in holes in fruit trees, coconut palms or stumps of those tree varieties, and have 2 or 3 egg clutch sizes.
