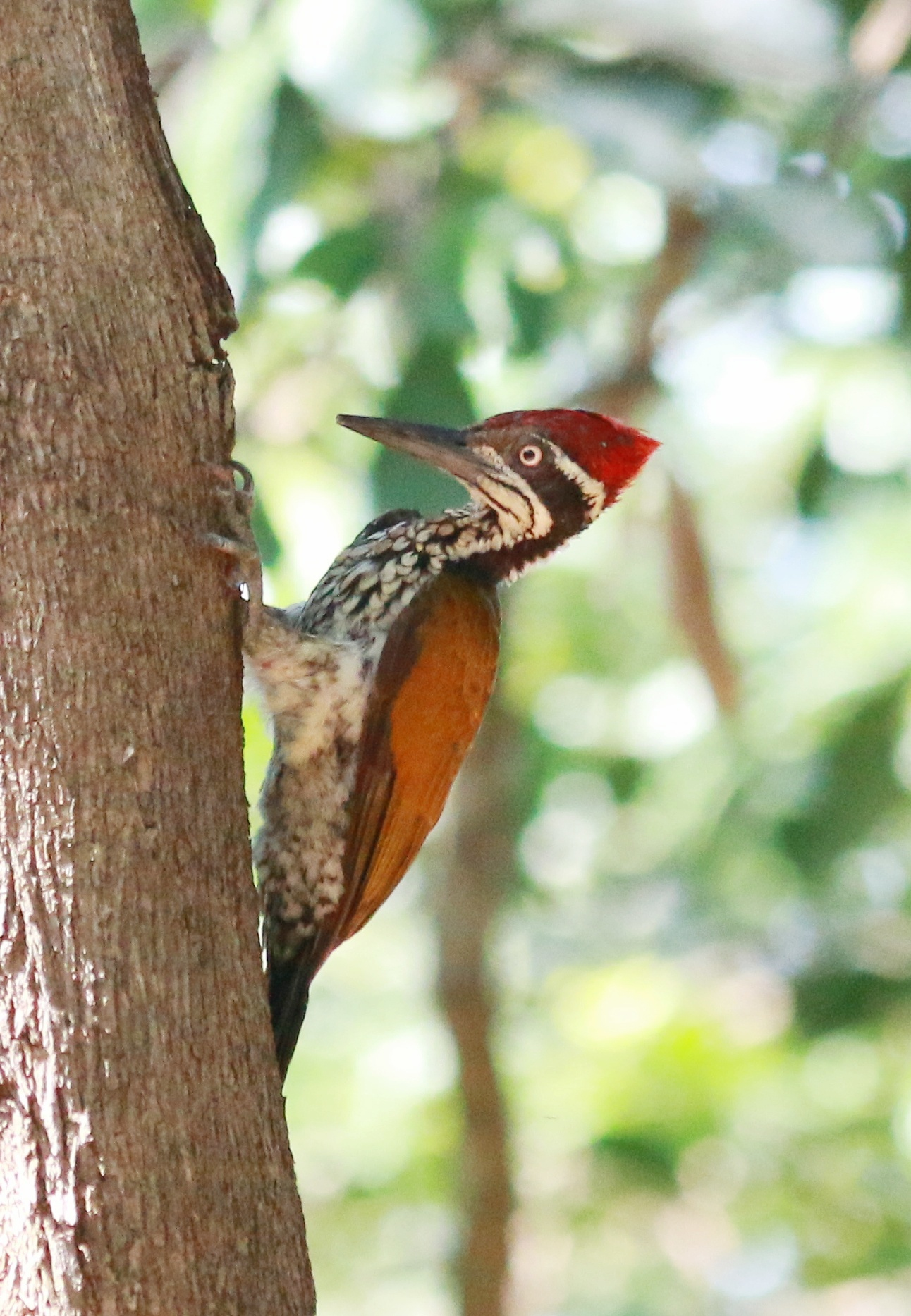
- Male in Kerala

Scientific classification
- Kingdom: Animalia
- Phylum: Chordata
- Class: Aves
- Order: Piciformes
- Family: Picidae
- Genus: Chrysocolaptes
- Species: C. socialis

Binomial name
- Chrysocolaptes socialis Koelz, 1939

Synonyms
- Chrysocolaptes guttacristatus socialis

Audio
- Calls of C. socialis, recorded in Wayanad district

= Malabar flameback =

Species of bird

The Malabar flameback (Chrysocolaptes socialis) is a species of bird in the woodpecker family Picidae. It is endemic to the Western Ghats of India.

It was previously considered a subspecies of the greater flameback (C. guttacristatus), but was split as a distinct species by the International Ornithological Congress in 2022 based on a 2021 study noting differences in plumage and vocalizations between both species.

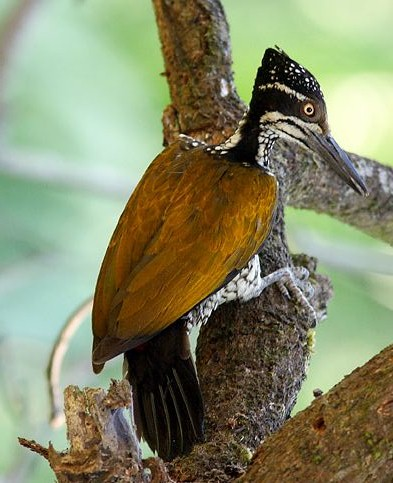
Female Western Ghats Malabar flameback (C. socialis) at Sirsi, Karnataka (India)

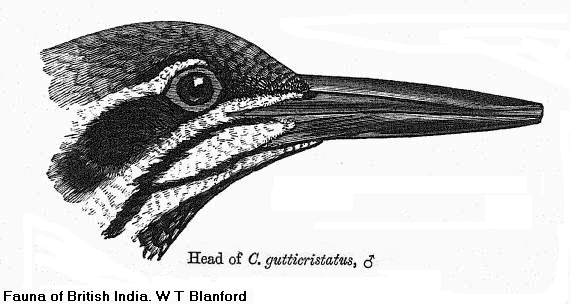
Head pattern of Western Ghats Malabar flameback (C. socialis): The thin and divided black "moustache" can be used to distinguish it from similar Dinopium flamebacks.
