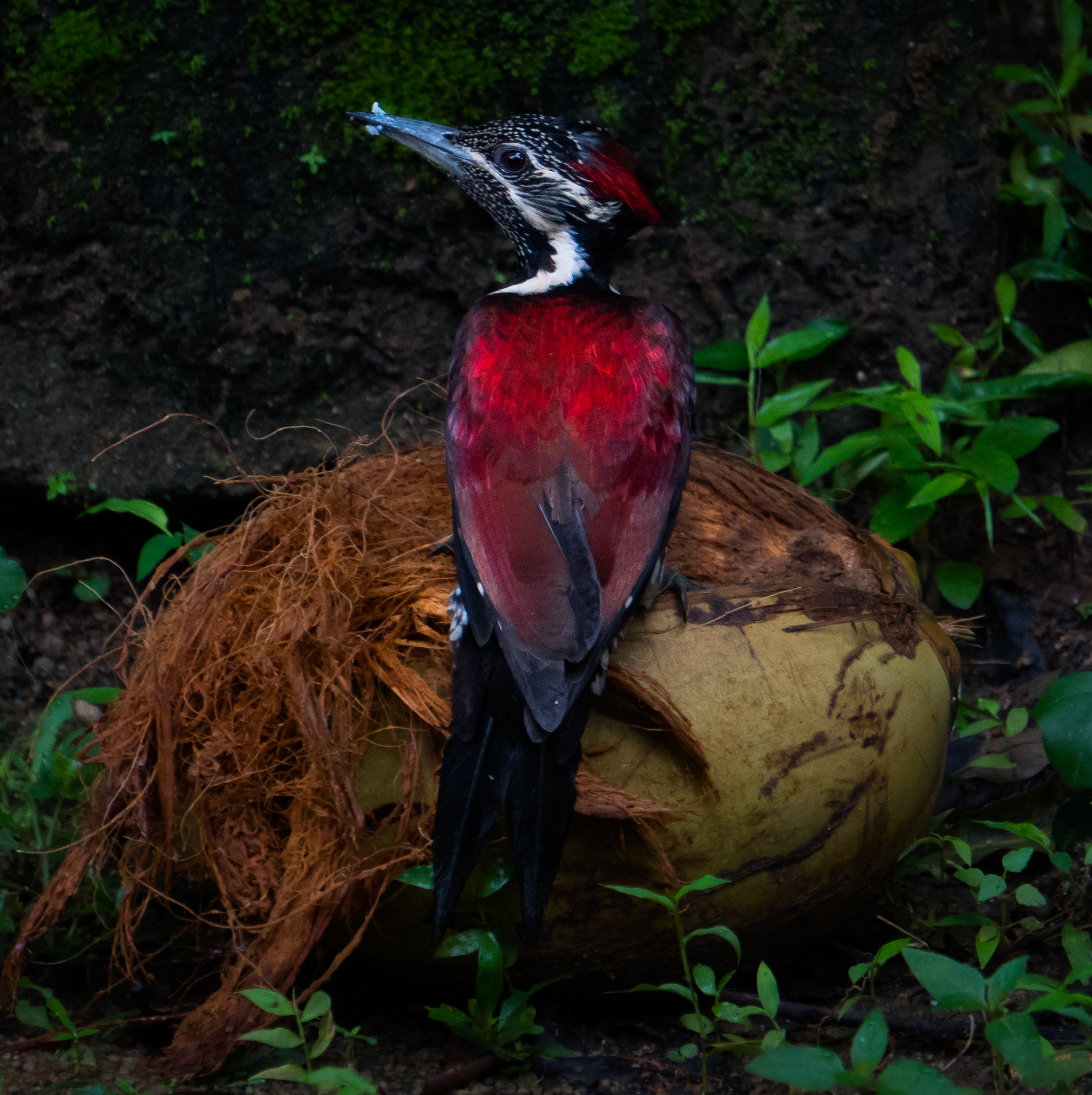
- Female
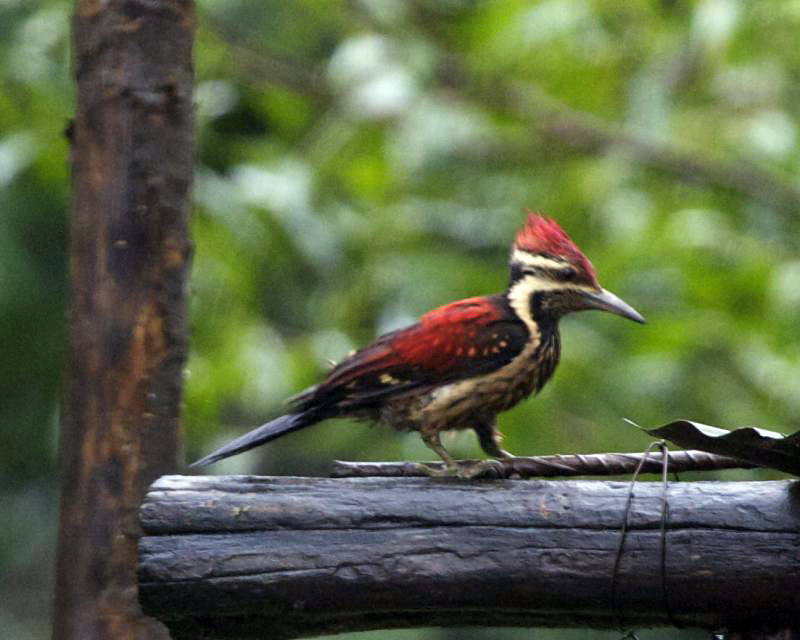
- Male

Conservation status
- Least Concern (IUCN 3.1)

Scientific classification
- Kingdom: Animalia
- Phylum: Chordata
- Class: Aves
- Order: Piciformes
- Family: Picidae
- Genus: Dinopium
- Species: D. psarodes

Binomial name
- Dinopium psarodes (Lichtenstein, AAH, 1793)
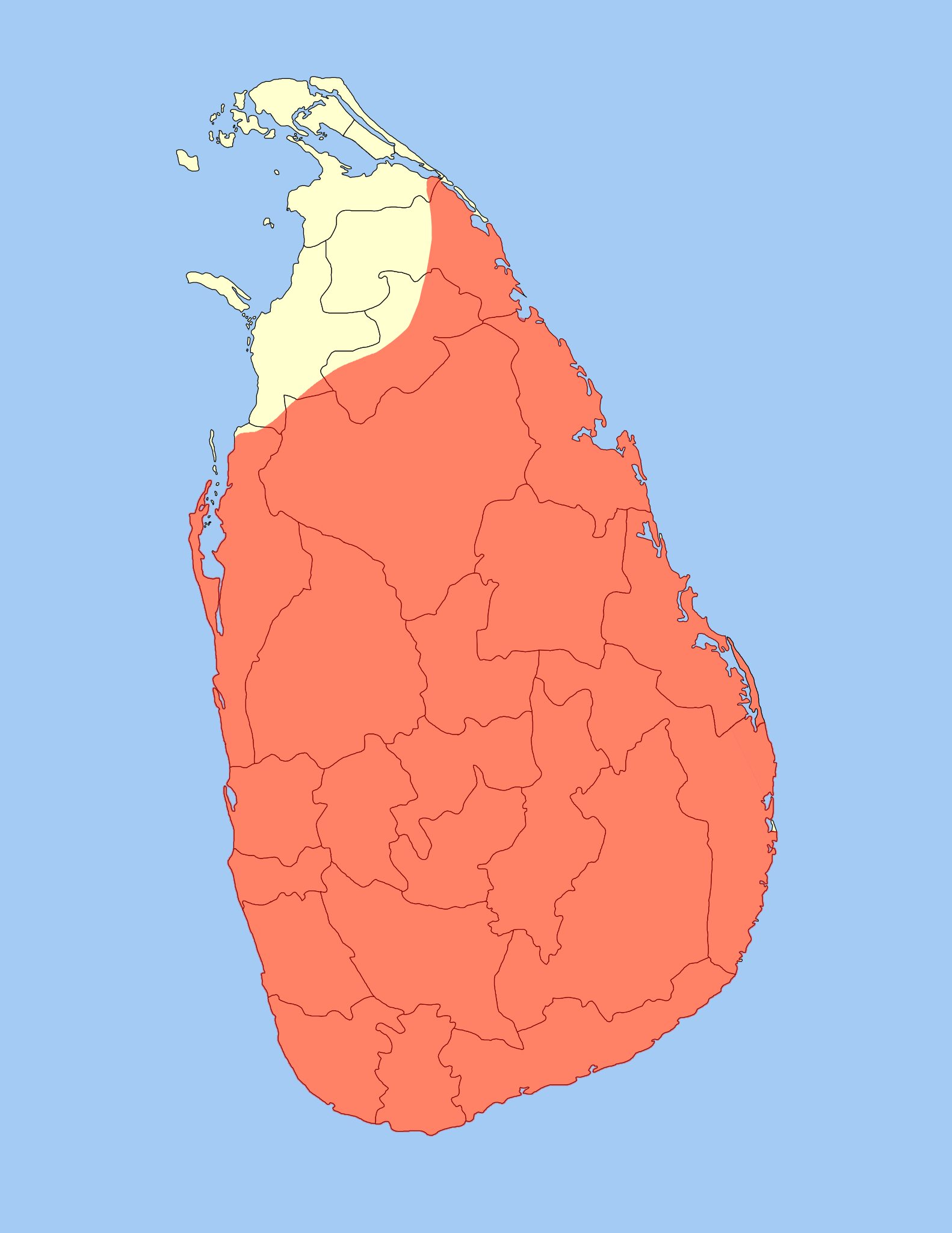

Synonyms
- Dinopium benghalense psarodes Brachypternus ceylonus (Legge, 1880)

= Red-backed flameback =

Species of bird

The Red-backed flameback, Lesser Sri Lanka flameback, Sri Lanka red-backed woodpecker or Ceylon red-backed woodpecker (Dinopium psarodes) is a species of bird in the family Picidae. It is endemic to Sri Lanka, only absent in the far-north. It is sometimes considered a subspecies of the Black-rumped flameback.

== Phylogenetics ==
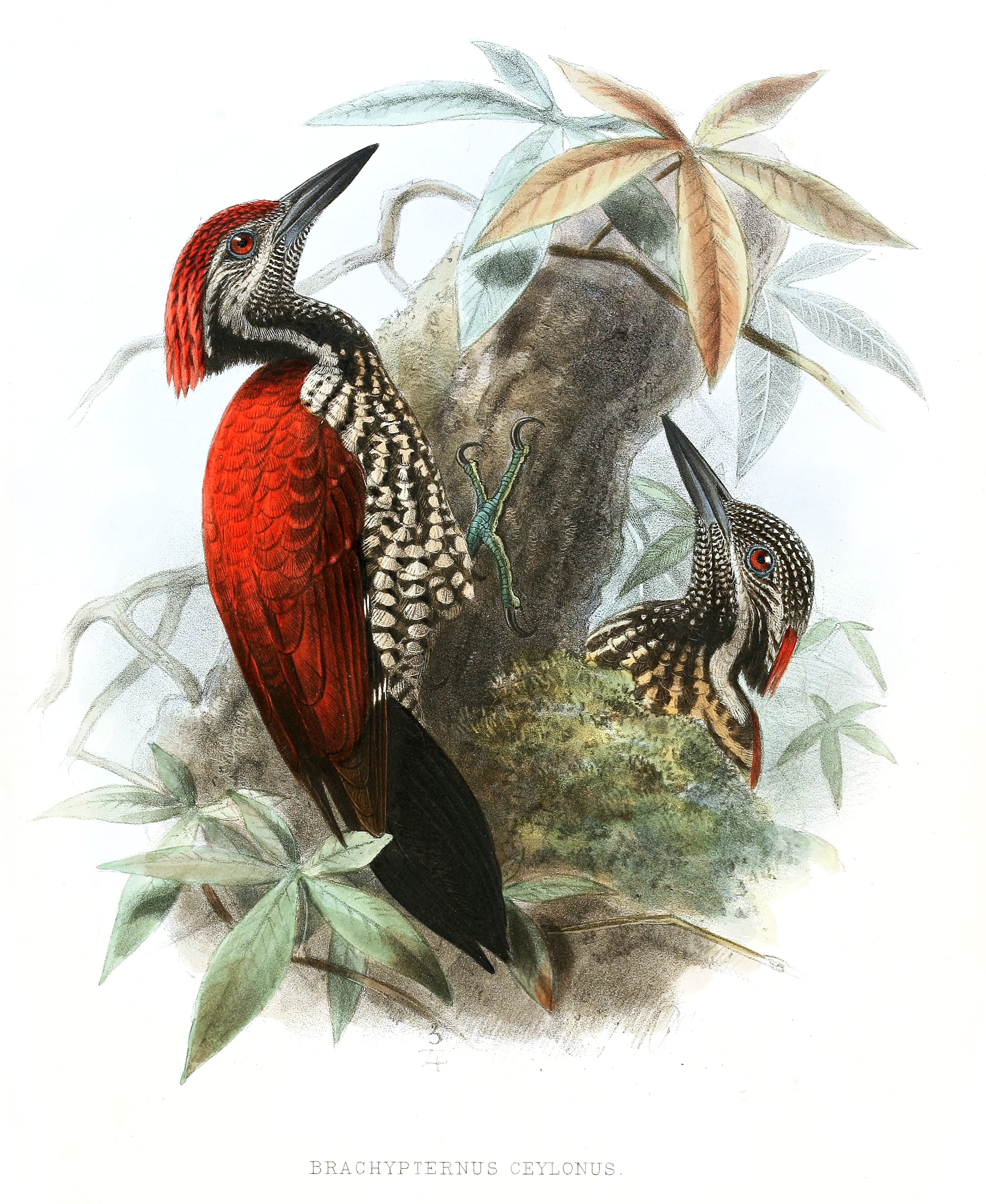
Painting by John Gerrard Keulemans, marked as Brachypternus ceylonus, painted in 1878.

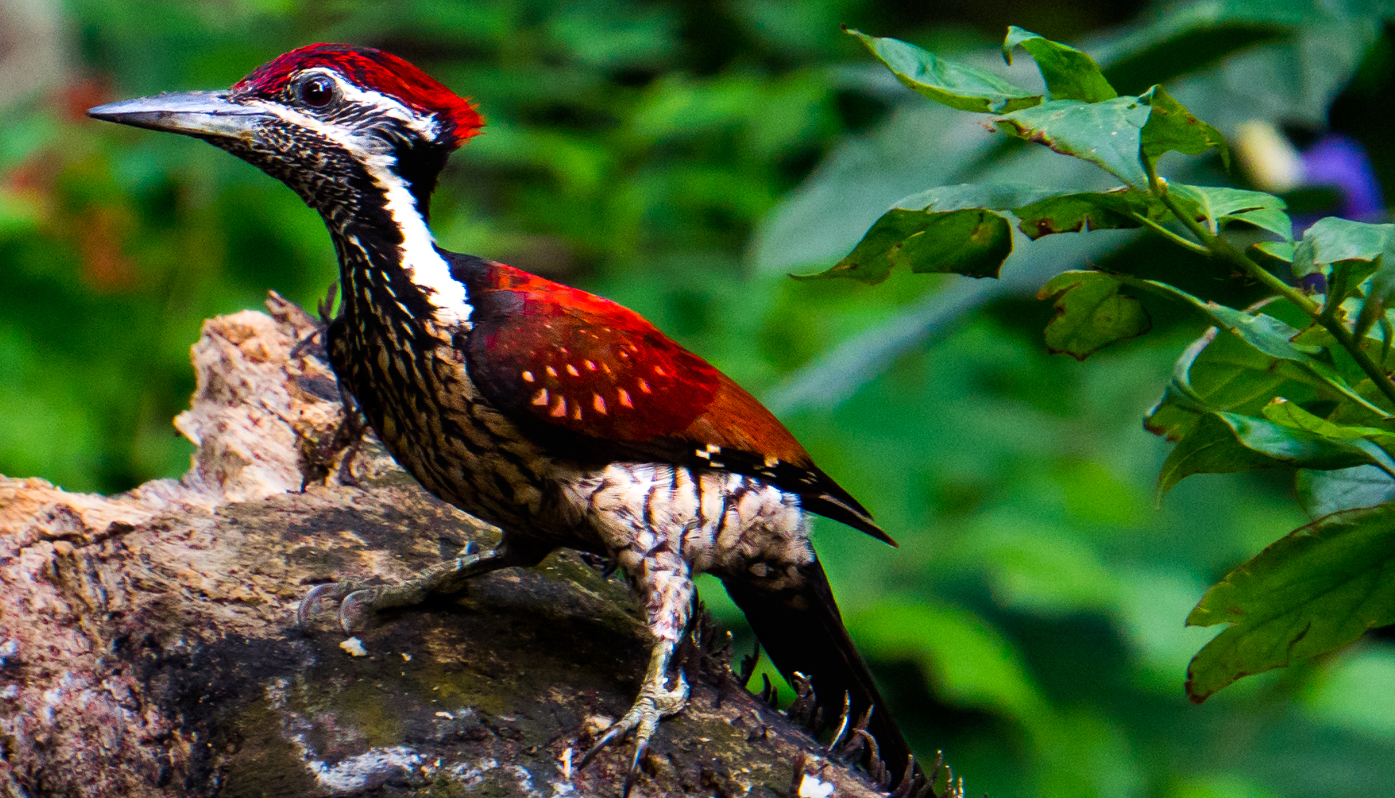
Male of reddish orange hybrid form, presumably juvenile. Orange can clearly be seen, indicating a hybrid.

It has been considered an endemic species since the time of Legge. It was first placed in the genus Brachypternus as Brachypternus ceylonus. It was later lumped as subspecies of the Black-rumped flameback (Dinopium benghalense), as Dinopium benghalense psarodes. It was elevated to full species status in a study by Sampath S. Seneviratne, Darren E. Irwin, and Saminda P. Fernando.

In this study, it was found to hybridize with the Black-rumped flameback. The hybridization is concentrated north of a border from Trincomalee to the base of Puttalam lagoon and south of a border from Mullaitivu to Mannar. Hybridization is less out of this border, where the Black-rumped flameback dominates north of the border while the Red-backed flameback dominates south of the border. It is a case of Hybrid inferiority, in which the pure species are more successful than the hybrids.

It is one of the three species of red coloured flamebacks which are found only in Sri Lanka and the Philippines. It is also the only red-coloured Dinopium species. The other Red flamebacks are the Crimson-backed flameback (Chrysocolaptes stricklandi) of Sri Lanka, and the Luzon flameback (Chrysocolaptes haematribon) of the Philippines (Except for the Yellow-faced flameback (Chrysocolaptes xanthocephalus), but it is mostly yellow.) This analogous trait (a trait shared by two organisms by convergent evolution, which means that they evolved to be similar independently because of similar evolutionary pressures) suggests that some evolutionary pressure in Sri Lanka and the Philippines caused their endemic flamebacks to become red. No subspecies are recognized.

== Description ==
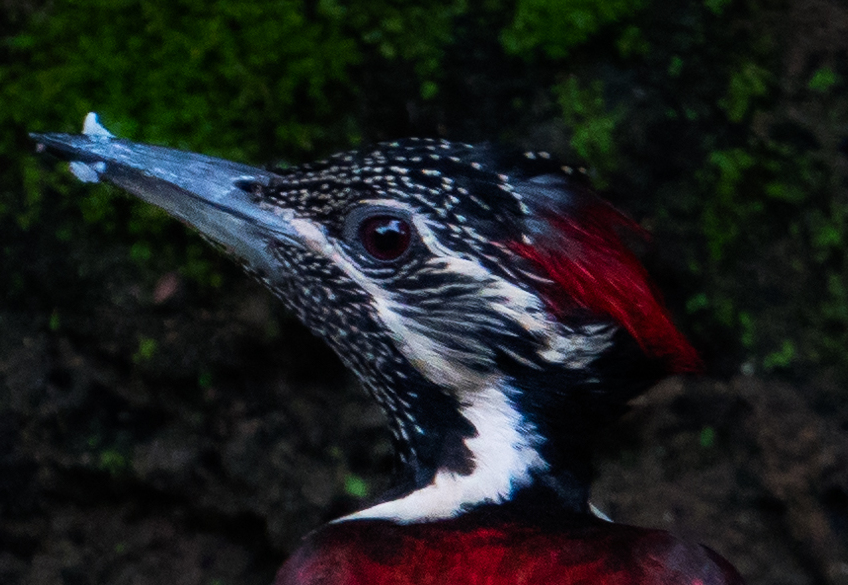
Female head, which clearly shows the spots on forecrown and forehead, streaks between eye and nape, and spots on throat.

About 28 centimetres (11 in) in length. Mostly crimson with black trailing edges to wings. underparts white with messy black marks. The breast and neck are black with white spots on the throat and white streaks on the breast. A black eyestripe stretches to the back of the neck and diffuses into the nape and upper back, with white streaks between the eye and neck. It has a red crown, with the forecrown and forehead black speckled with white in females. The eye is hidden among the black eyestripe. It has a fairly sized grey bill, which forms a blunt point. Juveniles are duller with less bold markings, with males having white spots on crown and females with few spots if not none. Hybrids can be either mostly red with orange or yellow (closer to Red-backed flameback) or mostly yellow with red or orange (closer to Black-rumped flameback)

== Habitat ==
Its natural habitats are subtropical or tropical dry forests, subtropical or tropical moist lowland forests, and subtropical or tropical mangrove forests, including manmade environments like home gardens. It can be seen from 1,500 metres (4,900 ft) away. Mostly found in the dry zone, but likes humid environments.

== Behaviour and ecology ==
=== Voice and sounds ===
Its voice is a sharp whinny which is more unmusical and screeching than that of D. benghalense. It can either go along in a rhythmic "woik-woik-wik-wi-ti-ti-t-t t-t-trrrrrr!" or a repeated "woik-tri-tri-tri-tri-tri-tri-tri- !" which lasts for three seconds. Has a dull drumroll of 0.8 - 1.5 seconds.

Whinnying call of a reddish-orange hybrid

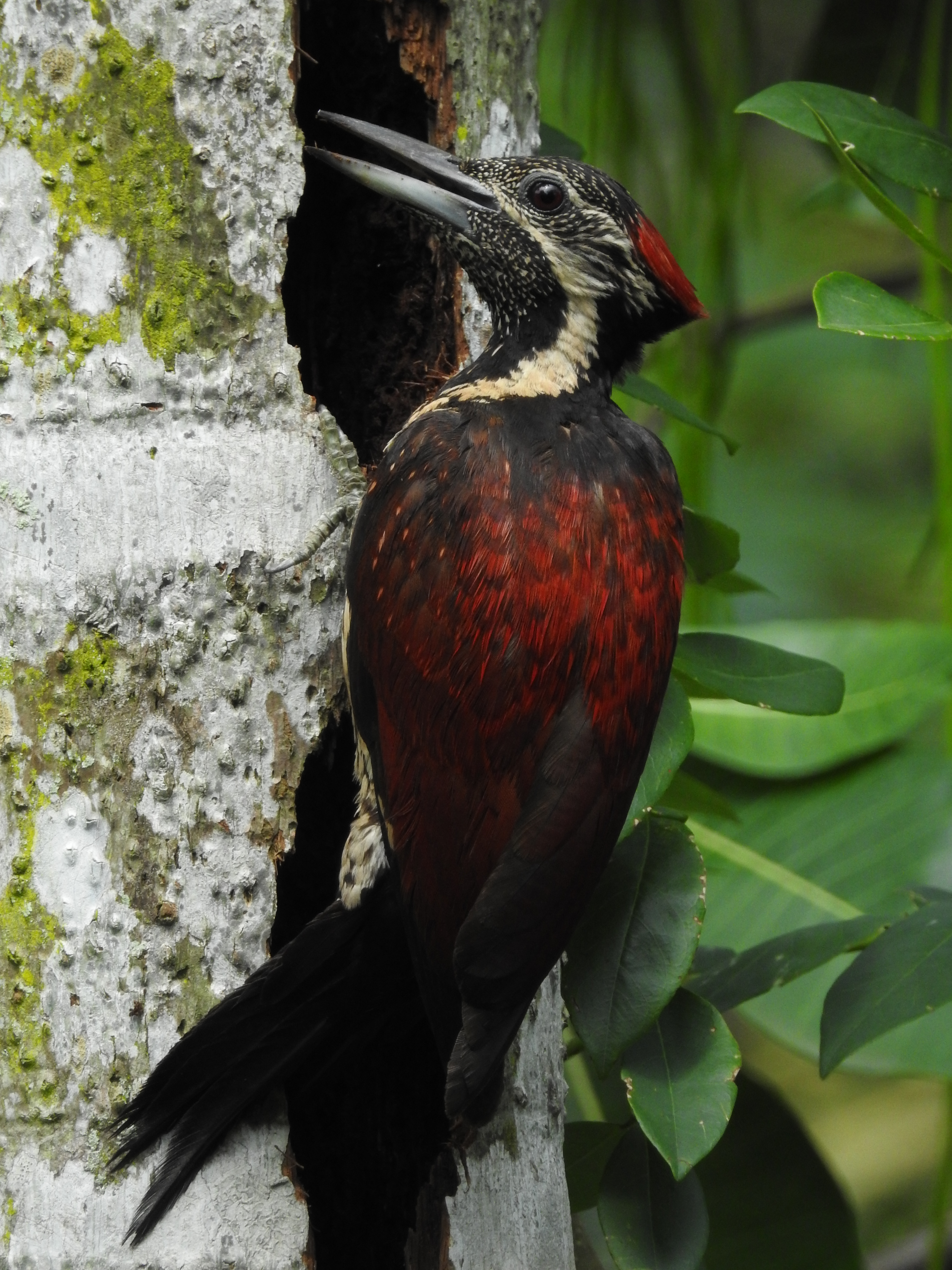

=== Foraging ===
==== Diet ====
Its main source of food are ants. It seems to prefer Carpenter ants (Camponotus spp.), ants in the genus Meranoplus, and the pupae and larvae of Asian weaver ants (Oecophylla smaragdina). Other invertebrates eaten include spiders, caterpillars, weevils and beetles. Also feeds on some fruit occasionally, as a source of dietary fiber and other nutrients.

==== Foraging behaviour ====
It uses its tail as a support to climb trees, and flies in a flap-and-glide bounding pattern. It breaks into leaf nests of weaver ants in the trees themselves but descends to the ground to access nests of ground ants. Forages alone, in pairs or as a family group, and often joins multi-species foraging flocks, like other Dinopium flamebacks.

=== Breeding ===
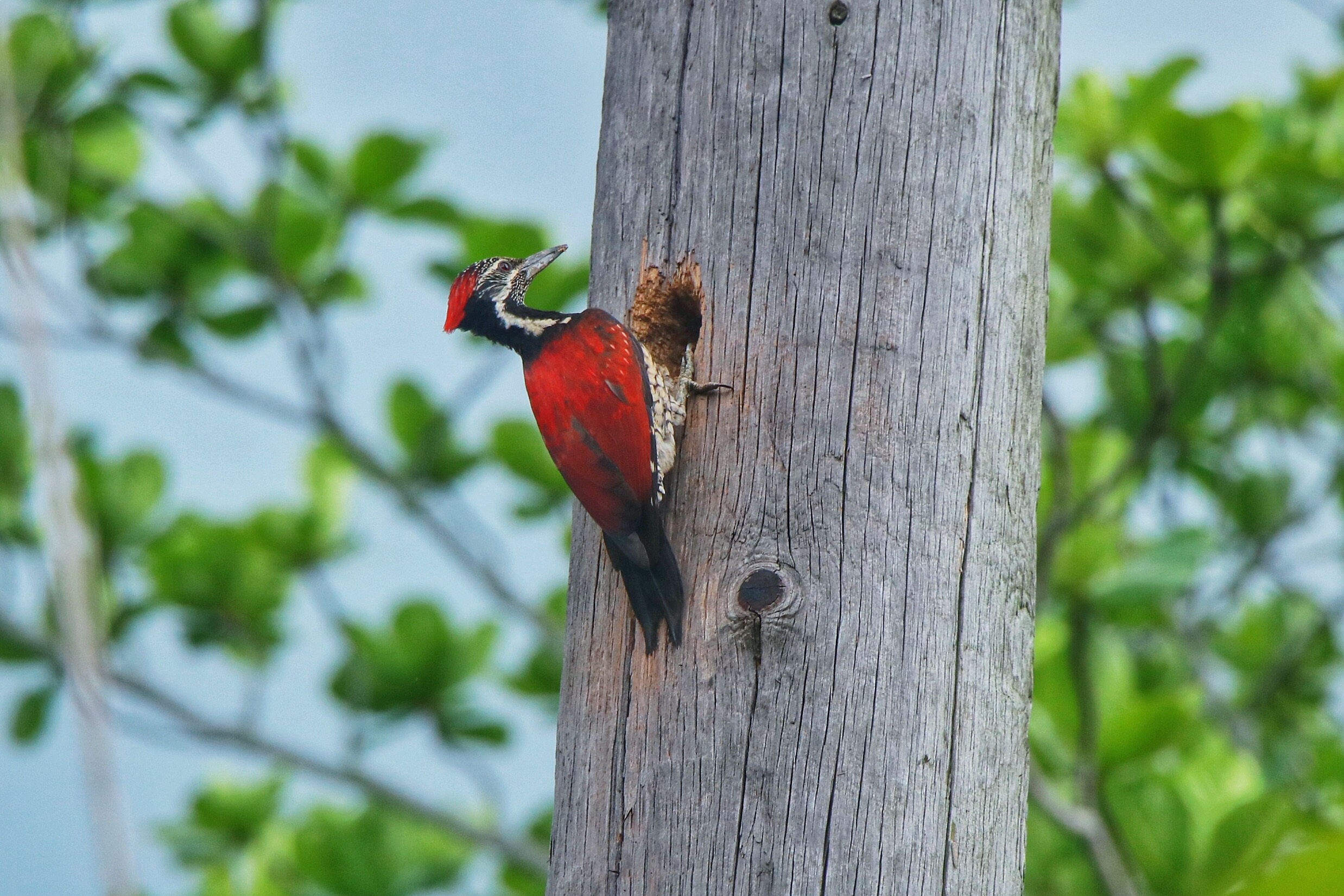
Female making a nest cavity or foraging.

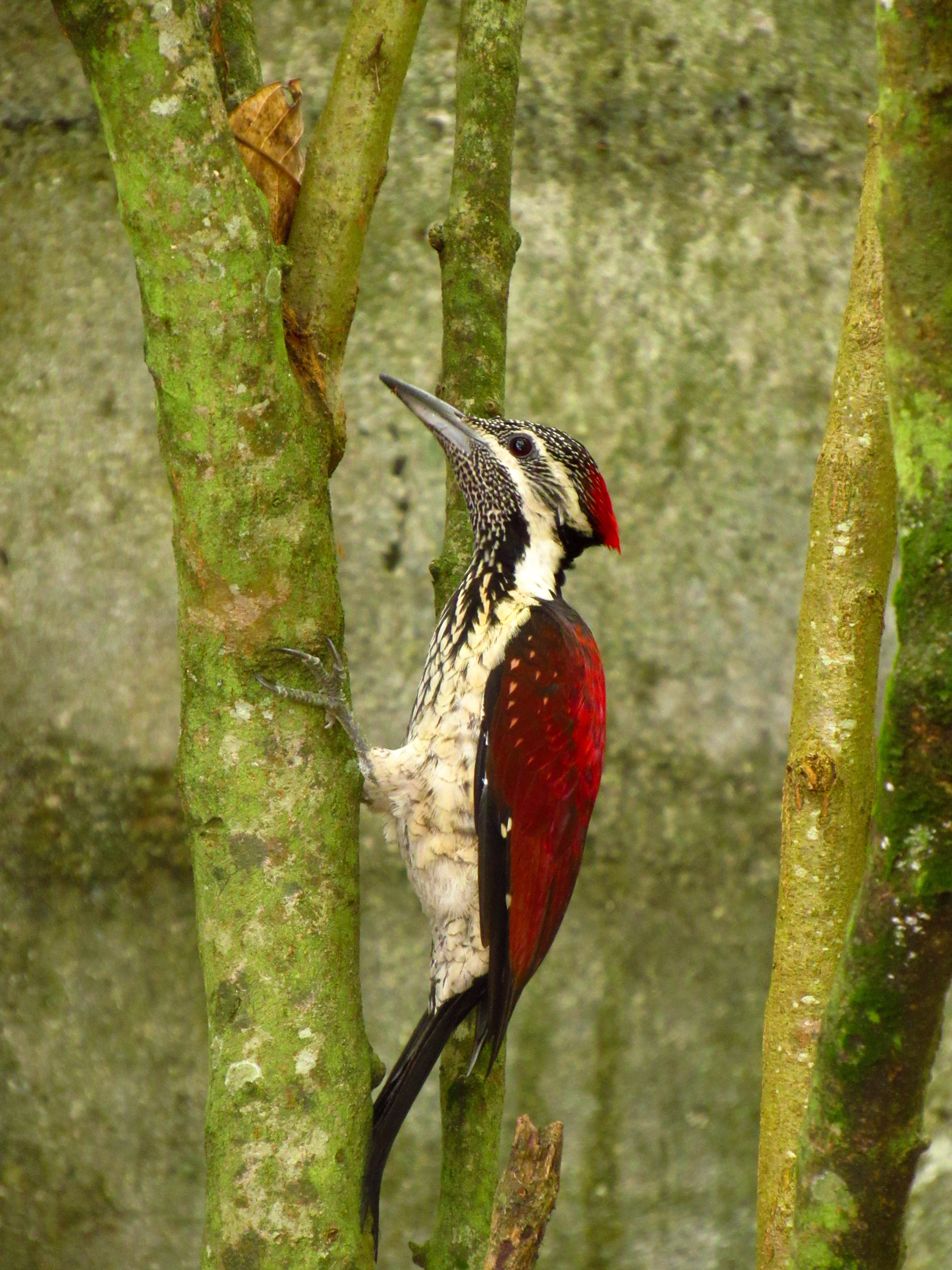
Scaling a tree

It drills nest holes at many variable heights. These holes, which can only be built by woodpeckers, barbets and other Piciformes, are nesting sites for other cavity-nesting birds like parrots, who cannot make their own holes. Sometimes broods twice, but usually only one clutch is laid per season. It breeds from December-September, predominantly from August-September and from February-June. Two-three eggs are laid per clutch.

== Conservation ==
It is marked as least concern on the IUCN red list, because it has a stable yet unknown population and is common to locally common in its comparatively small range. No declines nor threats have been identified. It is very common, one of the "Common" endemics throughout Sri Lanka, along with the Sri Lankan junglefowl, the Sri Lanka hanging parrot, and the Crimson-fronted barbet. It is the most common woodpecker species in Sri Lanka.
