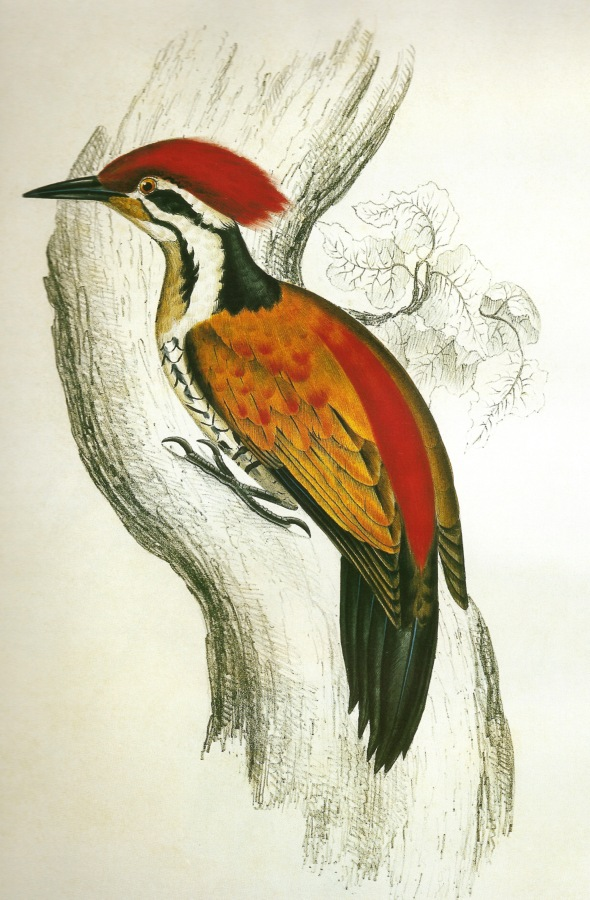

Conservation status
- Least Concern (IUCN 3.1)

Scientific classification
- Kingdom: Animalia
- Phylum: Chordata
- Class: Aves
- Order: Piciformes
- Family: Picidae
- Genus: Dinopium
- Species: D. shorii

Binomial name
- Dinopium shorii (Vigors, 1831)

= Himalayan flameback =

Species of bird

The Himalayan flameback (Dinopium shorii), also known as the Himalayan goldenback, is a species of bird in the family Picidae. At the moment very little is known of this species and more fieldwork is required. The Himalayan flameback is not threatened but it is suspected that deforestation could severely affect the species population.

== Description ==
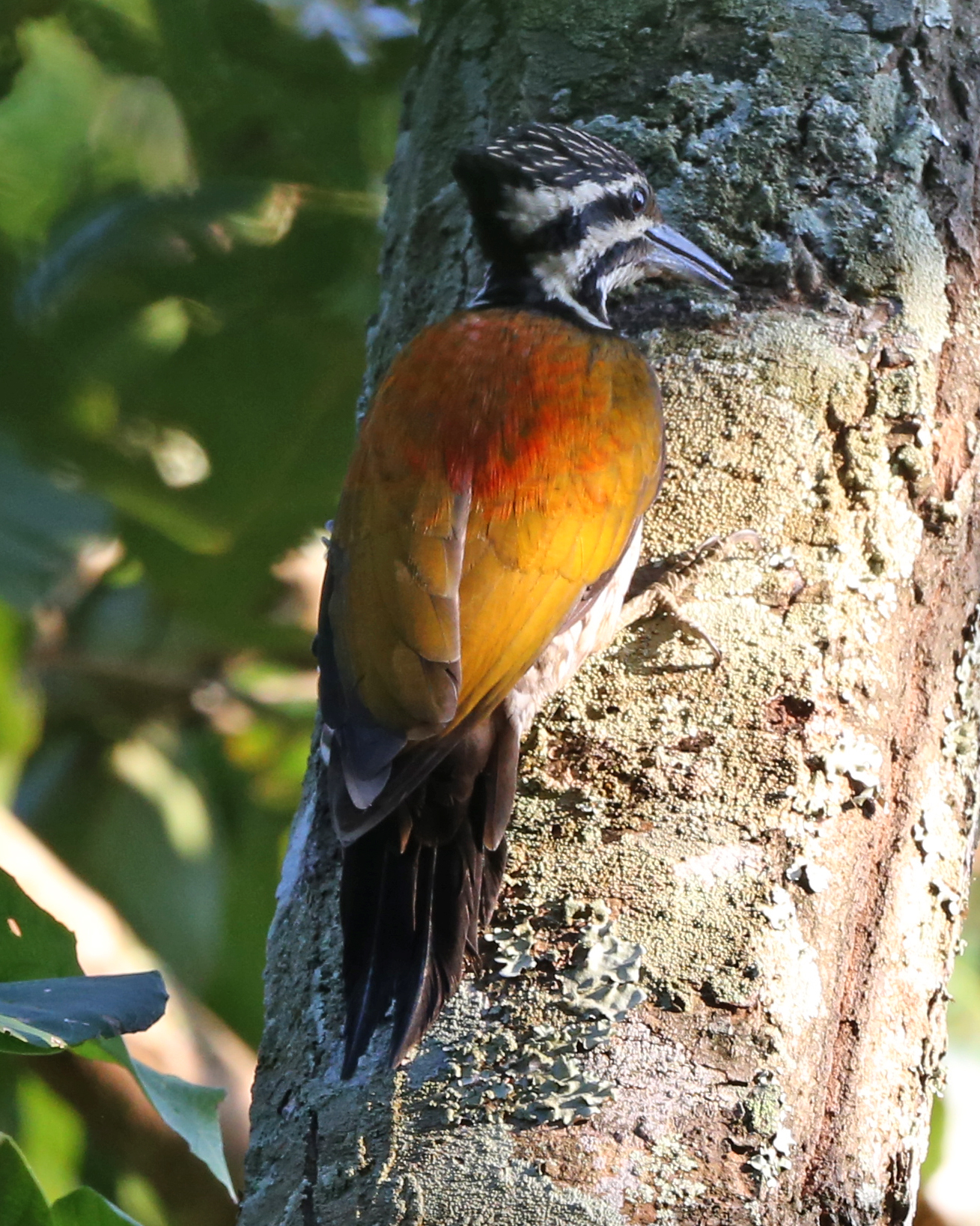
A female at Chitwan, Nepal

The Himalayan flameback is very similar in appearance to the Greater Goldenback (Chrysocolaptes lucidus) but they are not at all closely related. The primary differences are its smaller size and bill. The Himalayan flameback can be identified by its black hind neck, and the brownish center on its throat, which can go down the breast on some and is bordered by an irregular black spotting. They also have an indistinct divided moustachial stripe, the center of which is brownish, and sometimes reddish in males. The Himalayan flameback also has either reddish or brown eyes and three toes. The breast of the Himalayan flameback is irregularly streaked with black, but on occasion completely white. Their wings are coppery brown to red. Lastly, the males have a yellowish-red forehead that becomes more red on the crest. In contrast, the female's crest is entirely black and streaked with white. In both sexes, the crest is bordered by white and black bands on either side of their head.

== Taxonomy ==
Part of the family Picidae and the genus Dinopium, which consists of woodpeckers with only three toes, the Himalayan flameback forms a superspecies together with the Common flameback. There are also two recognized sub-species within the Himalayan flameback: D.s. shorii and D.s. anguste. The sister species of the Himalayan flameback are Meiglyptes tristis and Celeus brachyurus. The species epithet honors Frederick John Shore, an East India Company official who sent a specimen of the bird to the Zoological Society of London, where it was described and named by Vigors.

== Distribution and habitat ==
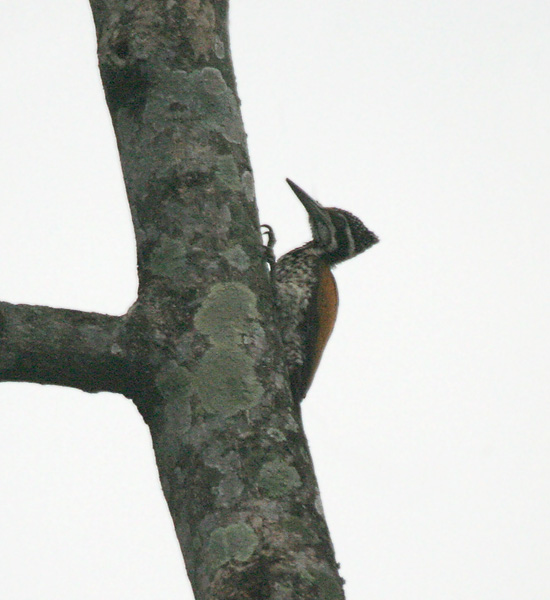
Himalayan flameback at Jayanti in Buxa Tiger Reserve in Jalpaiguri district of West Bengal, India

Himalayan flamebacks are commonly found in the Indian subcontinent, primarily in the lower-to-middle altitudes of the Himalayan sal forest region. Its range spans Bangladesh, Bhutan, India, Myanmar, and Nepal, where they are year-round residents. A disjunct population also occurs in the south-eastern Ghats. The Himalayan flameback's habitat mainly comprises mature tropical/subtropical deciduous forests as well as semi-evergreen forests. They prefer lowland Ficus and Bombax forests.

== Behavior ==
=== Vocalization ===
The Himalayan flameback call is a series of rapidly repeated klak-klak-klak-klak-klak. The call is slower and softer than that of the Greater Goldenback.

=== Diet ===
The diet of Himalayan flamebacks is poorly known. They mainly flock and feed together with other birds such as the Greater Goldenback. It is assumed that their primary prey is insects: the same as many other woodpecker species.

=== Reproduction ===
Very little is known of their breeding habits. What is known is that they breed from March to May and nest in excavated holes in trees. Their clutch size is 2–3 eggs.
