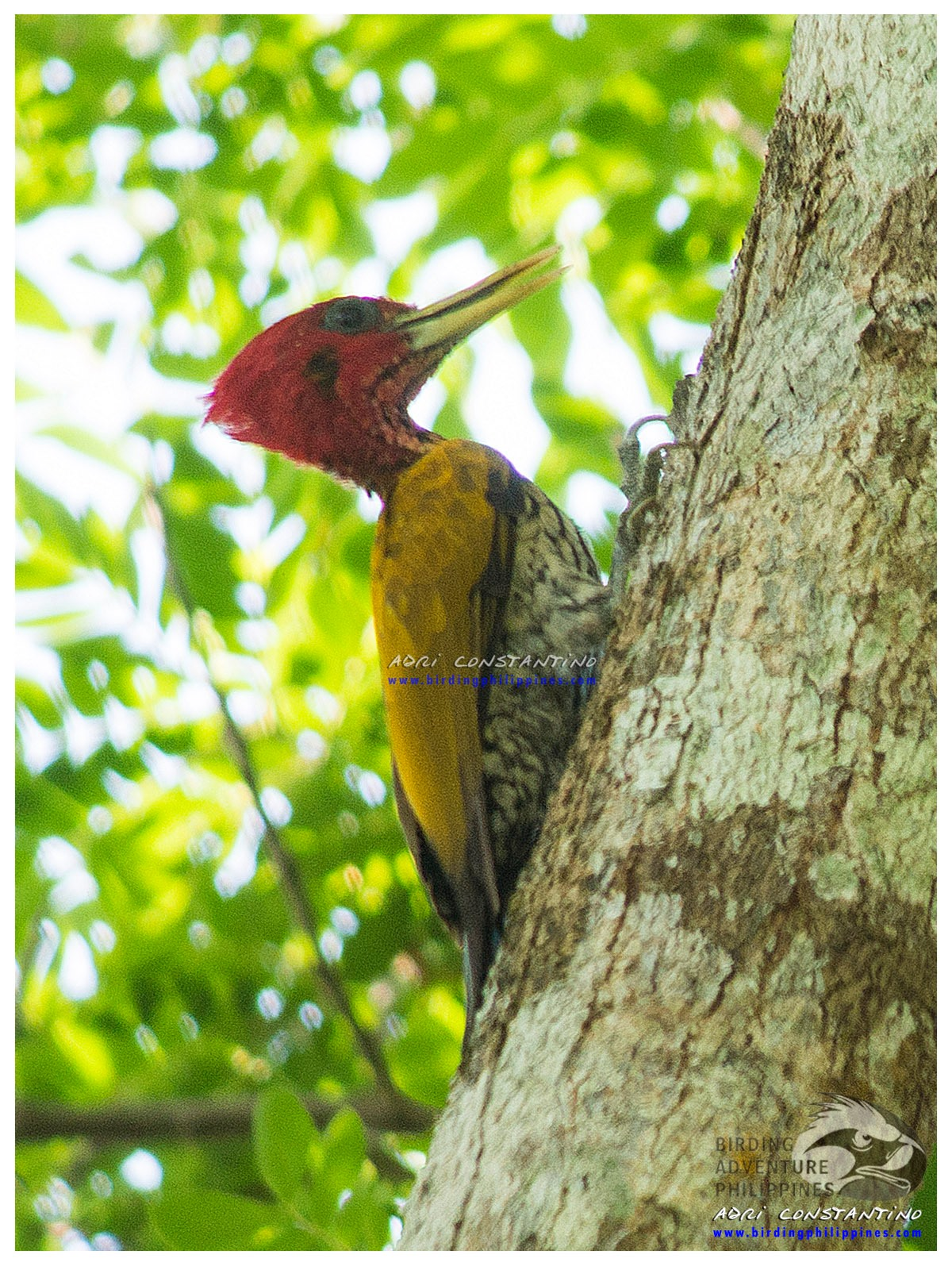
- Male
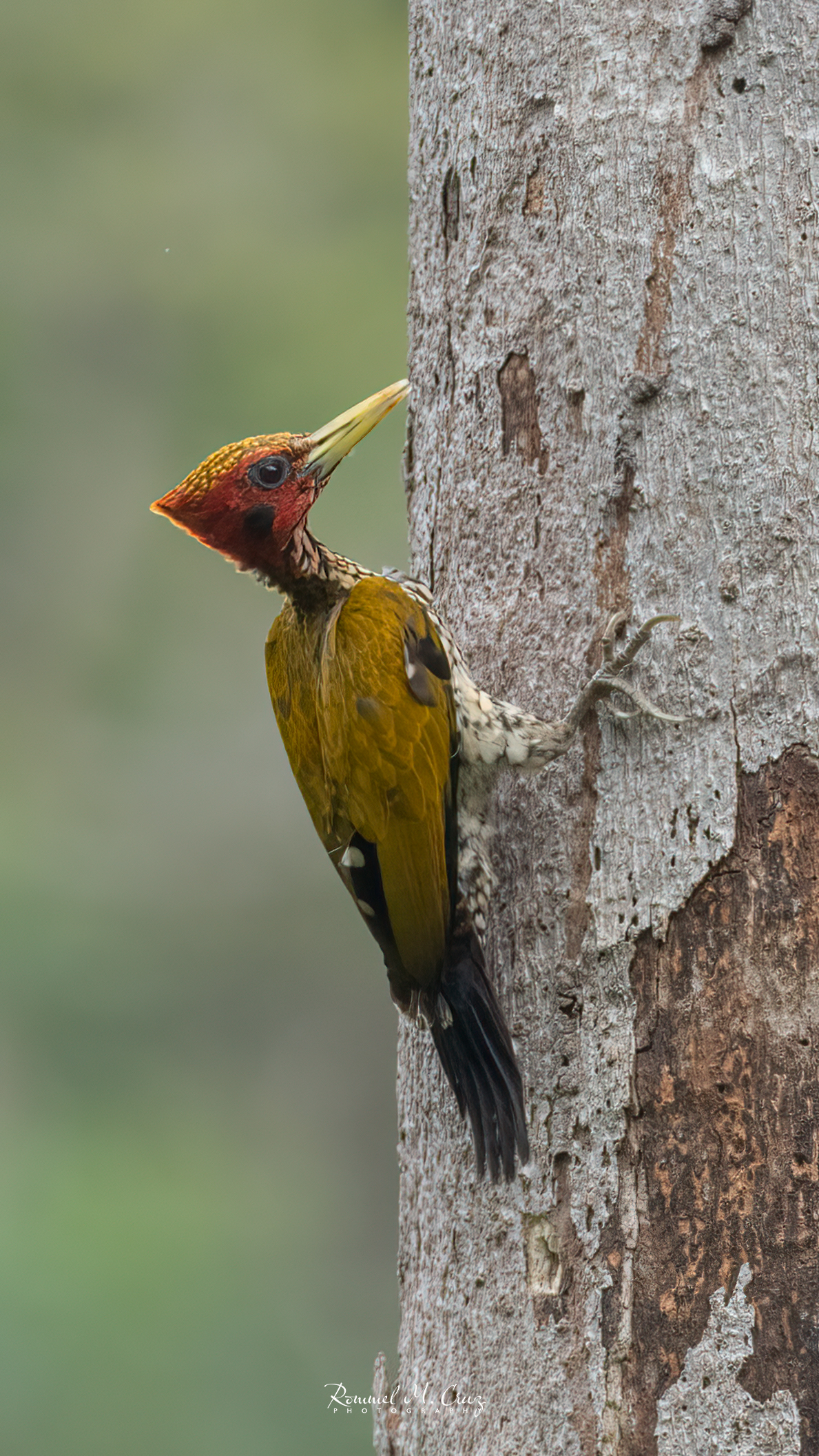
- Female

Conservation status
- Near Threatened (IUCN 3.1)

Scientific classification
- Kingdom: Animalia
- Phylum: Chordata
- Class: Aves
- Order: Piciformes
- Family: Picidae
- Genus: Chrysocolaptes
- Species: C. erythrocephalus

Binomial name
- Chrysocolaptes erythrocephalus Sharpe, 1877

= Red-headed flameback =

Species of bird

The red-headed flameback (Chrysocolaptes erythrocephalus) is a species of bird in the family Picidae. It is endemic to the Philippines only being found in the region of Palawan in the islands of Balabac, mainland Palawan, Busuanga and Calamian. It is one of the most spectacular flamebacks with its bright red head and yellow-green back. It is sometimes considered a subspecies of the greater flameback. It is found in moist lowland forests including primary, secondary and even plantations and clearings provided there are still standing trees. It is threatened by habitat loss.

== Description ==
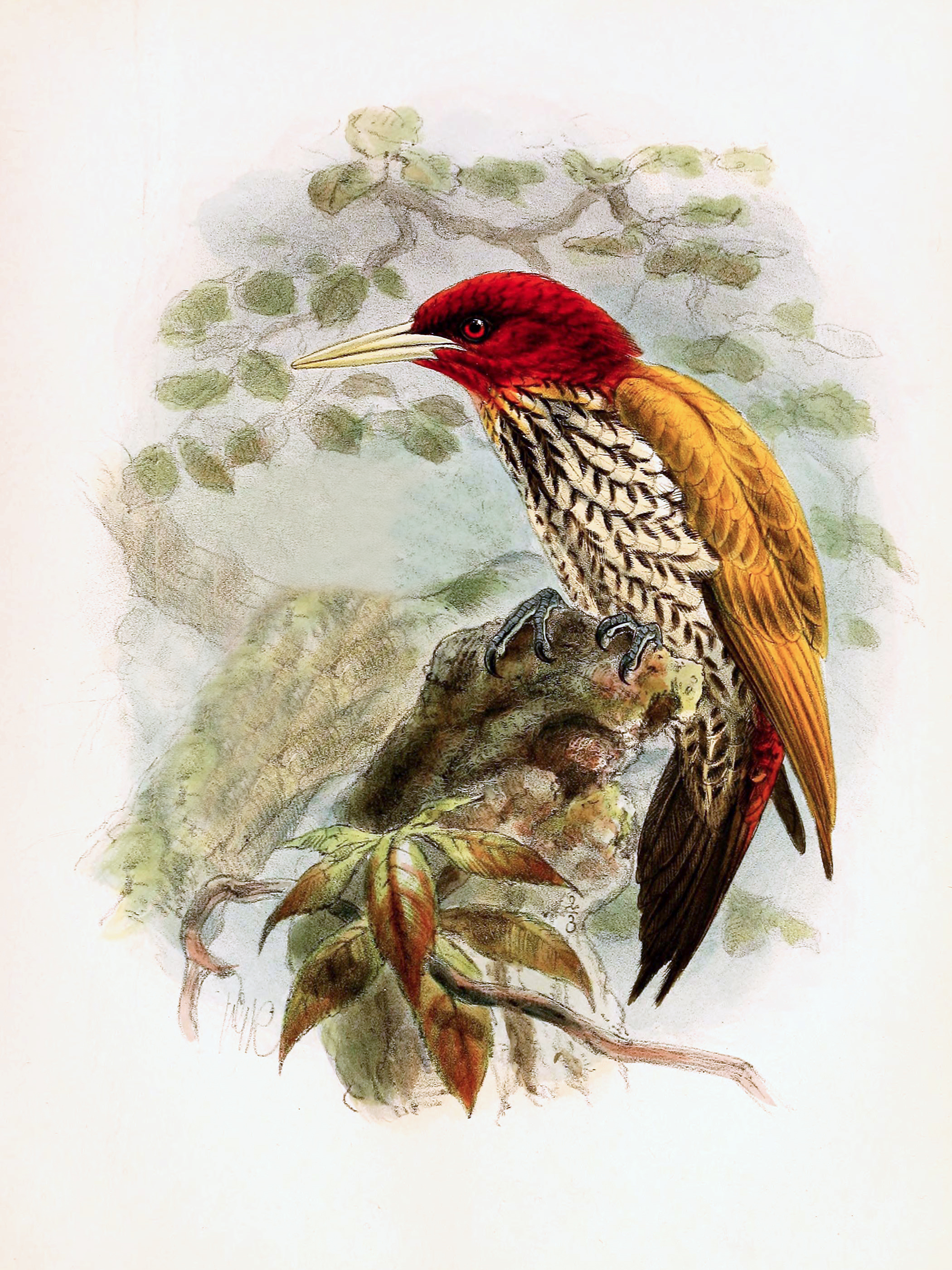
An illustration of a male

It is a large species of woodpecker found in the forests of Palawan. It has a golden greenish back with a reddish hue, the underparts are dark cream with spotting. Neck is yellowish with dark stripes. Its iris is dark red and as grayish legs. Like all flamebacks, bill is a sturdy and long chisel shaped.

They exhibit sexual dimorphism in which males have all red heads and the females have paler red heads with yellowish spots.

Its call is described as a loud trill.

== Taxonomy ==
This species is part of the Greater flameback species complex which has now been split into 8 distinct species. This species is distinct red head in males and a yellow and olive flecked crown in females, a yellowish bill and a golden back.

== Ecology and behavior ==
Not much is known about this species specific diet but based on other flameback species it is presumed to feed on large caterpillars, wood-boring larvaes, pupaes and ants. It is often seen foraging on larger trees and snags pecking and hammering the wood to find insects. Often seen in pairs or small family groups and even with White-bellied woodpecker and Spot-throated flameback

Nests in tree cavities. Breeding is believed to occur from January to May. The very similar Greater flameback lays 2 to 5 eggs which incubate in 2 weeks and fledge within a month.

== Habitat and conservation status ==
This bird is found in primary and secondary forest, and clearings with many standing trees, usually in pairs. Breeding activity has been recorded between Jan-May.

IUCN has assessed this bird as near threatened with the population being estimated at 5,000 to 7,500 mature individuals. It was previously listed as Endangered species with a lower population estimate of 1,000 to 2,499 mature individuals. This increased population estimate and downlisting does not mean that this species is increasing but rather reflects new data that this species occurs in higher densities than originally believed. The population is still said to be declining. This species' main threat is habitat loss and hunting.

Lowland forest loss, degradation and fragmentation have been extensive and are ongoing on Palawan and logging and mining concessions have been granted for most remaining forest tracts on the island. Illegal logging is thought to persist across much of the south.

It is recommended to conduct surveys in potentially suitable habitat in order to calculate density estimates, and calculate remaining extent of suitable habitat to refine the population estimate. Encourage careful reforestation activities around remaining forests and law enforcement to stop small-scale yet rampant illegal logging.
