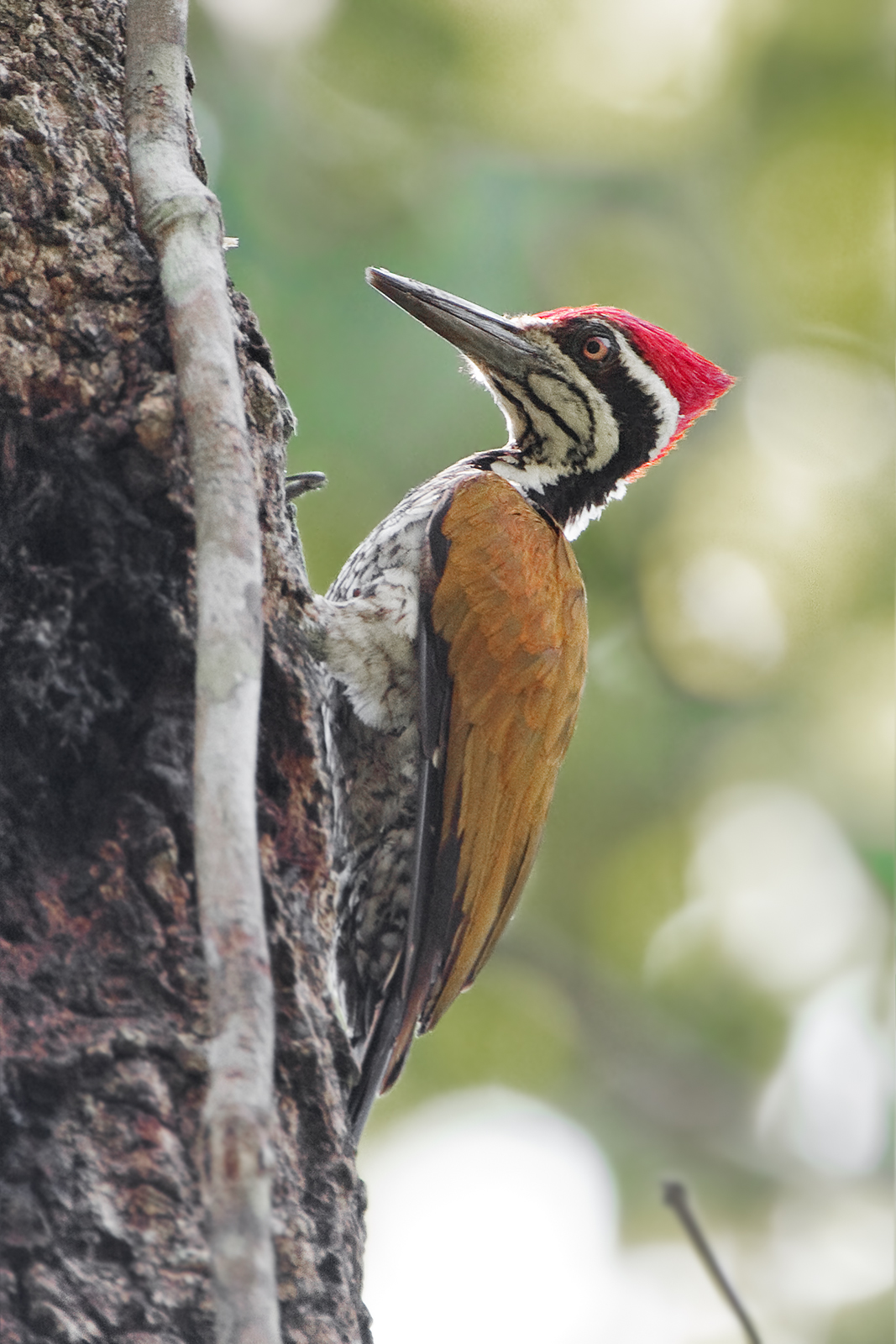
- Male in Kaeng Krachan National Park, Thailand

Conservation status
- Least Concern (IUCN 3.1)

Scientific classification
- Kingdom: Animalia
- Phylum: Chordata
- Class: Aves
- Order: Piciformes
- Family: Picidae
- Genus: Chrysocolaptes
- Species: C. guttacristatus

Binomial name
- Chrysocolaptes guttacristatus (Tickell, 1833)

= Greater flameback =

Species of bird

The greater flameback (Chrysocolaptes guttacristatus), also known as the greater goldenback or large golden-backed woodpecker, is a woodpecker species. It occurs widely in the northern Indian subcontinent, eastwards to southern China, the Malay Peninsula, Sumatra, western and central Java and northeast Borneo.

== Taxonomy ==
It has been suggested to split the greater flameback into the following species:

- Greater flameback, (C. guttacristatus) (C. lucidus if taken as a group and not split)
- Crimson-backed flameback, (C. stricklandi) of Sri Lanka
- Javan flameback (C. strictus) of eastern Java, Bali, and Kangean Islands
- Luzon flameback (C. haematribon) of Luzon, Polillo, Catanduanes and Marinduque in the northern Philippines
- Yellow-faced flameback (C. xanthocephalus) of Negros, Guimaras, Panay, Masbate and Ticao, Philippine Islands
- Buff-spotted flameback (C. lucidus) of Bohol, Leyte, Samar, Biliran, Panaon, Mindando, Basilan, and Samal, Philippine Islands
- Red-headed flameback (C. erythrocephalus) of Balabac, Palawan, Busuanga, and Calamian, Philippine Islands
- Malabar flameback (C. socialis) of southwestern India

== Description ==
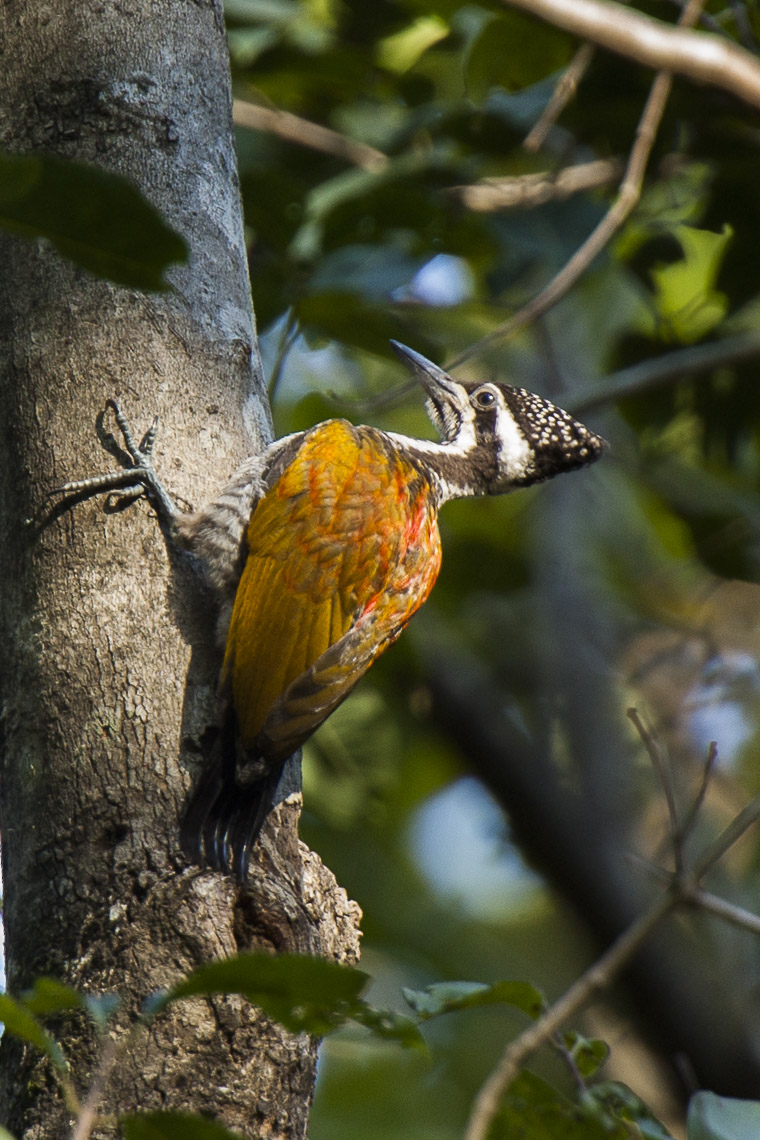
Female in Jim Corbett National Park

The greater flameback is a large woodpecker, at 33 cm in length. It is of typical woodpecker shape, and has an erect crest and a long neck. Coloration is highly variable between subspecies; it always has unmarked golden-yellow to dark brown back and wings. The rump is red and the tail is black. The underparts are white with dark markings (chevrons, stripes, or bands), or light brown. The head is whitish with a black pattern, or it is yellow, brown, or red. The straight-pointed bill is longer than the head, and the legs have four-toed zygodactyl feet (two toes pointing forward, two backward) and are lead-grey in color. The eyes' irises are whitish to yellow.

The adult male greater flameback always has a red crown. Females have a crown color varying between subspecies, such as black spotted with white, yellow, or brown with lighter dots. Young birds are like the females, but duller, with brown irises.

=== Similar species ===
White-and-black-headed greater flameback subspecies resemble some of the three-toed Dinopium flamebacks, but are not particularly closely related. Unlike the black-rumped flameback (D. benghalense) and the common flameback (D. javanense), the greater flameback's dark moustache stripes are divided by white (making them inconspicuous at a distance); except in C. stricklandi, their hindneck is white (not black), and even in the Sri Lankan birds, the dark colour does not extend to between the shoulders as it does in Dinopium; consequently, when seen from behind, the black-and-white-headed greater flamebacks outside Sri Lanka show a white neck bordered with black on the sides, while the Dinopium species have a black neck and upper back, with thin, white borders to the neck. Those flamebacks are also smaller (though this is only reliable in direct comparison), have a bill that is shorter than the head, and dark irises.

== Behaviour and ecology ==
Calls of C. l. socialis, recorded in Wayanad district, Kerala

This flameback is a species associated with a diversity of rather open forest habitat, such as found in the foothills of the Himalayas or in the Western Ghats; it also inhabits mangrove forest. It seems to be well-adapted to particular forest types, while the similar-looking common flameback (Dinopium javanense) is more of a generalist; thus, depending on what forests predominate in a region, C. lucidus may be more (e.g. in Thailand) or less common (e.g. in peninsular Malaysia) than D. javanense. In Malaysian mangrove forest, for example, the greater flameback has been found to prefer tall Avicennia alba for foraging, while the common flameback rather indiscriminately uses that species, as well as Bruguiera parviflora and Sonneratia alba.

Like other woodpeckers, the greater flameback uses its bill to dig out food from trees, and its zygodactyl feet and stiff tail to provide support against tree trunks. The long tongue can be darted forward to extract wood-boring arthropod prey; while mainly feeding on small invertebrates, greater flamebacks also drink nectar. They nest in tree holes, laying three or four white eggs.

== Conservation ==
Widely distributed and common in parts of its range, the greater flameback is classified as least concern on the IUCN Red List.

== Evolution ==
Convergent evolution in plumage between a larger and a smaller species is found among other woodpeckers, such as the North American downy woodpecker ("Picoides" pubescens) and hairy woodpecker ("P." villosus), the tropical American smoky-brown woodpecker ("P." fumigatus) and certain Veniliornis species, or the striped woodpecker (V. lignarius) and checkered woodpecker (V. mixtus), and some South American Piculus and "Picoides". In all of these cases, these birds are neither gregarious nor known to be bad-tasting, and due to their size difference and habitat preferences, do not compete much; hence the usual reasons for mimicry do not seem to apply. While the similar plumage may be due to sheer chance, perhaps as an atavism of plesiomorphic pattern, the facts that such cases are commonplace in the Picinae and that the species involved are usually sympatric suggests that some as yet undiscovered may benefit either some or all of the taxa involved.
