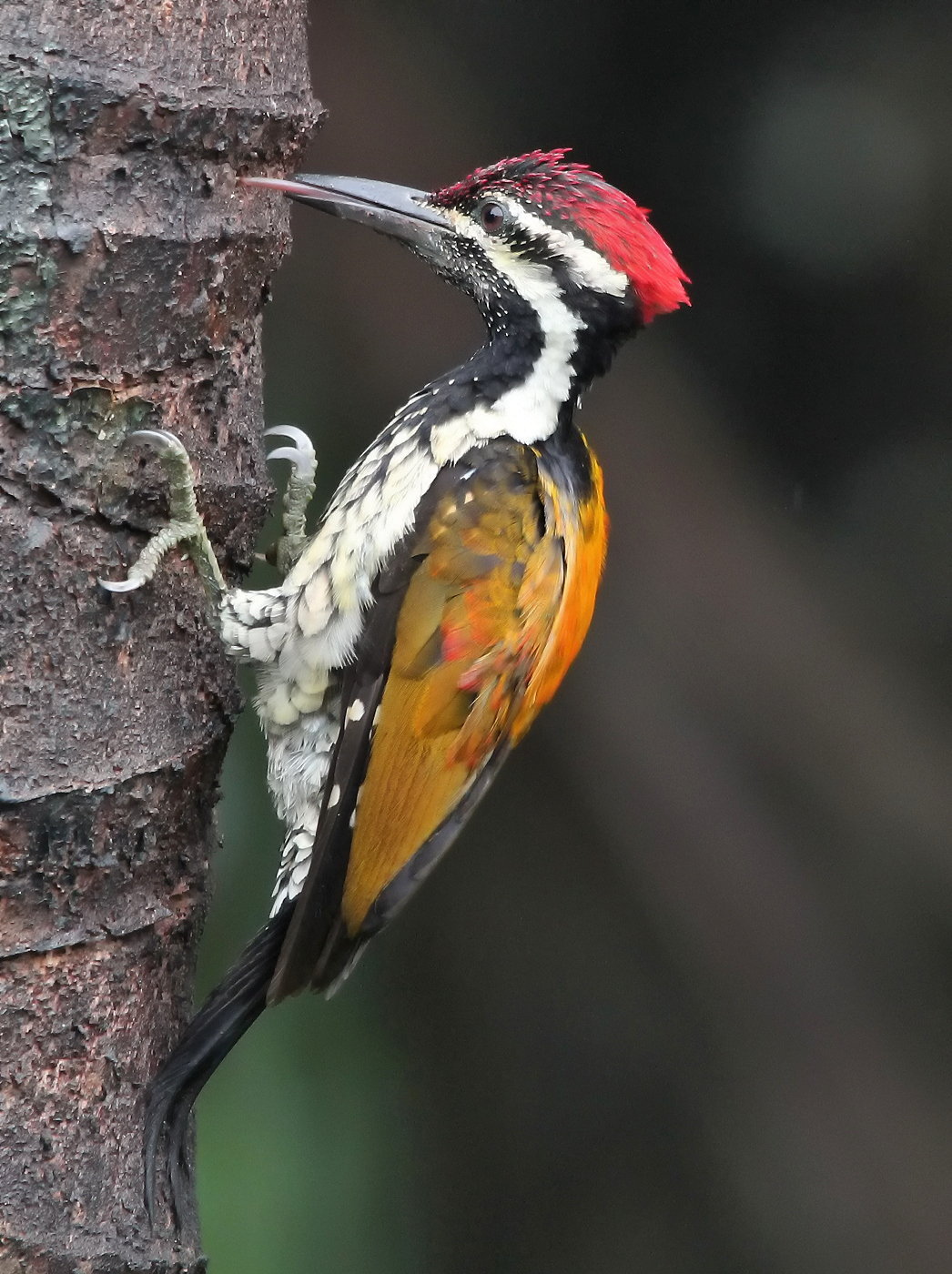
- Male
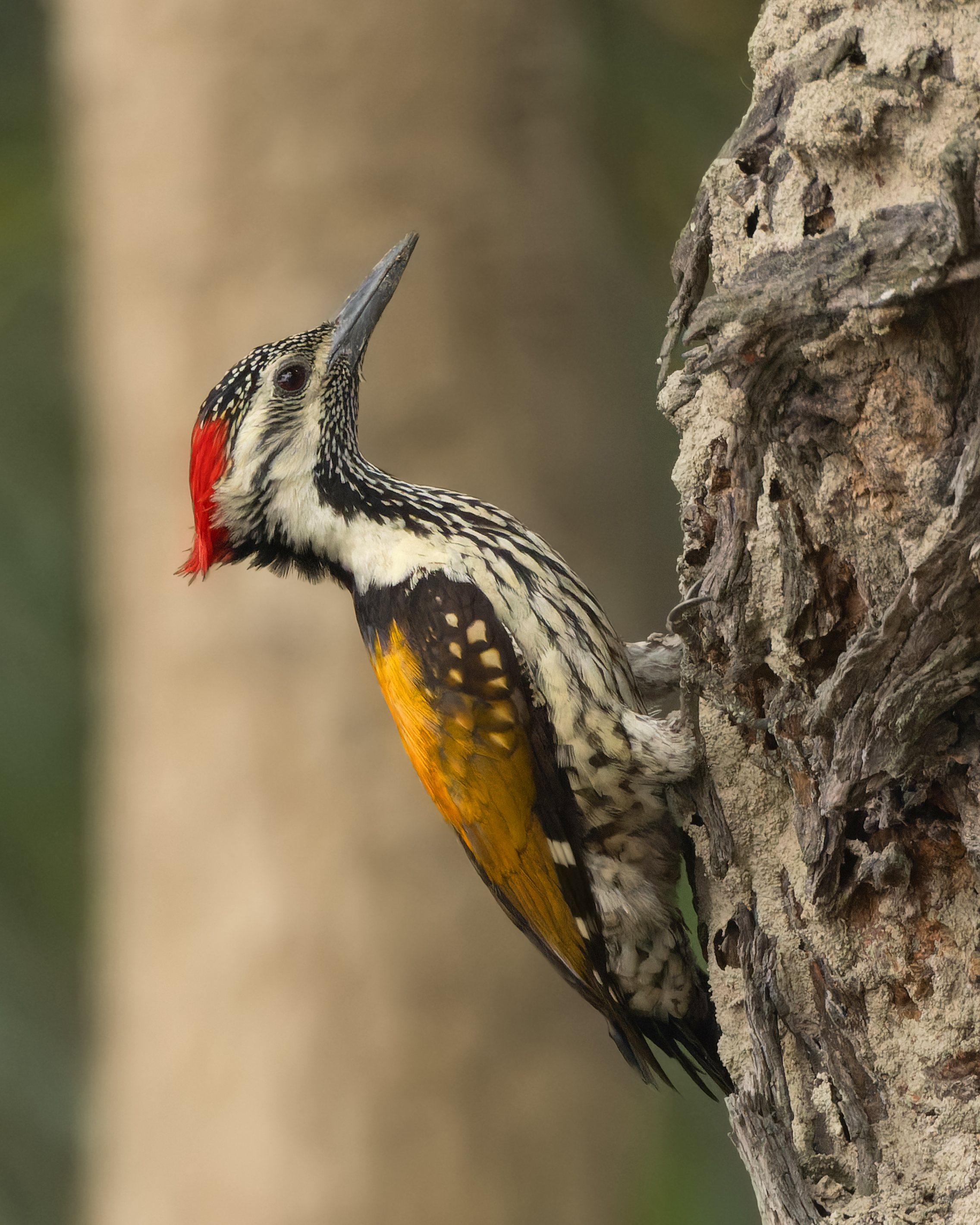
- Female Call

Conservation status
- Least Concern (IUCN 3.1)

Scientific classification
- Kingdom: Animalia
- Phylum: Chordata
- Class: Aves
- Order: Piciformes
- Family: Picidae
- Genus: Dinopium
- Species: D. benghalense

Binomial name
- Dinopium benghalense (Linnaeus, 1758)

Subspecies
- See text

Synonyms
- Picus benghalensis Linnaeus, 1758; Brachypternus benghalensis (Linnaeus, 1758); Brachypternus aurantius

= Black-rumped flameback =

Species of bird

The black-rumped flameback (Dinopium benghalense), also known as the lesser golden-backed woodpecker or lesser goldenback, is a woodpecker found widely distributed in the Indian subcontinent. It is one of the few woodpeckers that are seen in urban areas. It has a characteristic rattling-whinnying call and an undulating flight. It is the only golden-backed woodpecker with a black throat and a black rump.

== Taxonomy ==
The black-rumped flameback was described and illustrated by two pre-Linnaean English naturalists from a dried specimen that had been brought to London. In 1738 Eleazar Albin included the bird as the "Bengall Woodpecker" in his A Natural History of Birds and in 1751 George Edwards included the "Spotted Indian Woodpecker" in his A Natural History of Uncommon Birds. The black-rumped flameback was formally described by the Swedish naturalist Carl Linnaeus in 1758 in the tenth edition of his Systema Naturae under the binomial name Picus benghalensis. He cited the earlier descriptions by Albin and Edwards. This woodpecker is now placed in the genus Dinopium that was introduced by the French polymath Constantine Samuel Rafinesque in 1814.

Five subspecies are recognised:

- The nominate subspecies (D. b. benghalense) is found across India in the low elevations up to about 1000 m.
- The race in the arid northwestern India and Pakistan, D. b. dilutum (Blyth, 1852), has pale yellow upperparts, a long crest and whiter underparts than the nominate race of the Gangetic plains. The upperparts have less spots. It prefers to breed in old gnarled tamarisks, Acacia and Dalbergia trunks.
- The Southern Peninsular form, D. b. puncticolle (Malherbe, 1845), has a black throat with small triangular white spots and bright golden-yellow upperparts.
- The subspecies found in the Western Ghats is separated as D. b. tehminae (Whistler & Kinnear, 1934), (named after the wife of Salim Ali) and is more olive above, has fine spots on the black throat and the wing-covert spots are not distinct.
- The northern Sri Lankan race, D. b. jaffnense (Whistler, 1944), has a shorter beak.

The Sri Lankan red-backed flameback (Dinopium psarodes) was formerly treated as a subspecies of the black-rumped flameback. It has a crimson back and all the dark markings are blacker and more extensive. It sometimes intergrades with D. b. jaffnense near Puttalam, Kekirawa and Trincomalee.

== Description ==
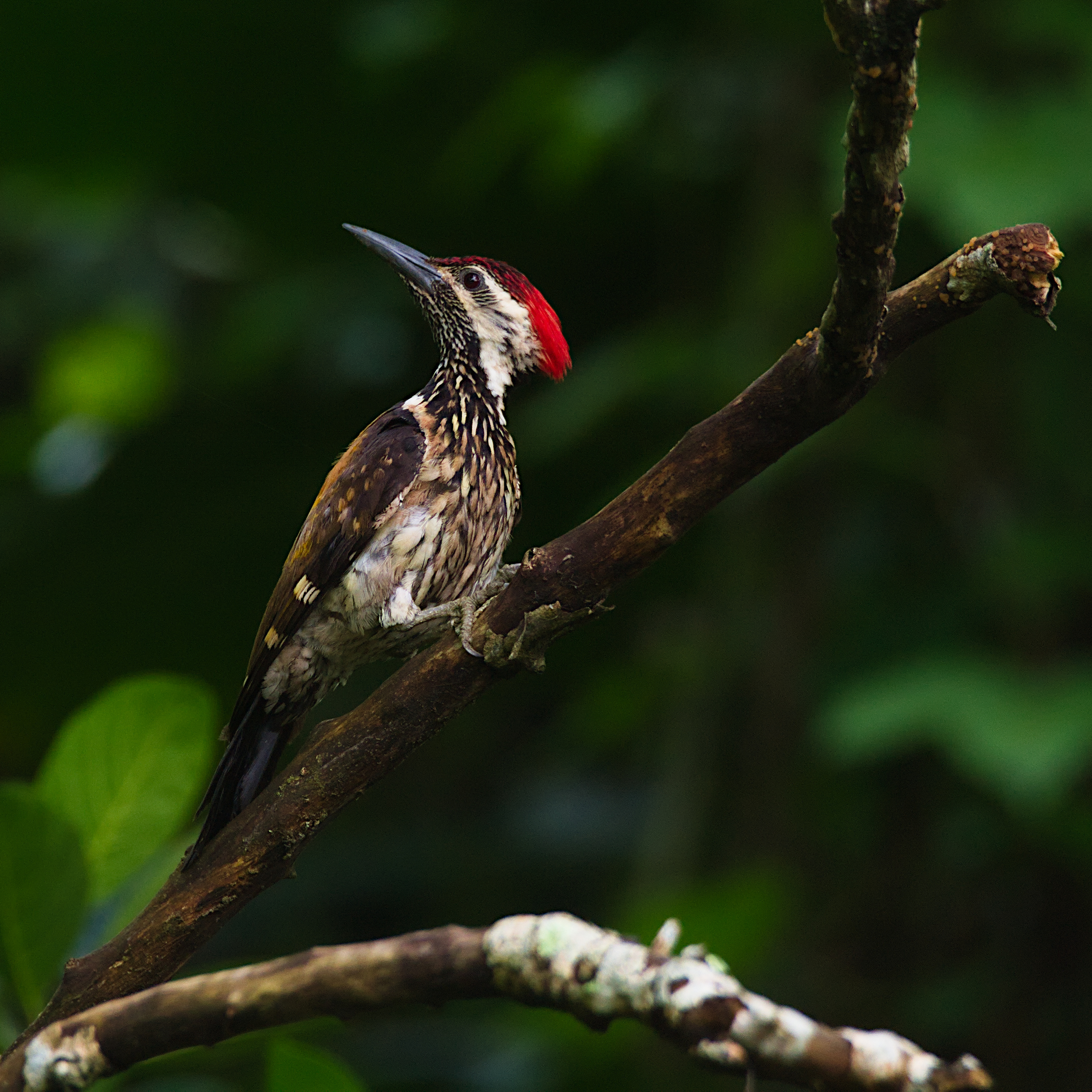
Lesser Goldenback in Guwahati, India

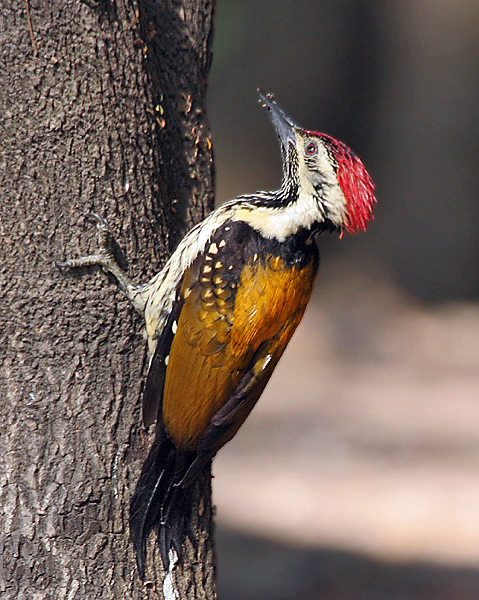
Nominate race in Kolkata, India

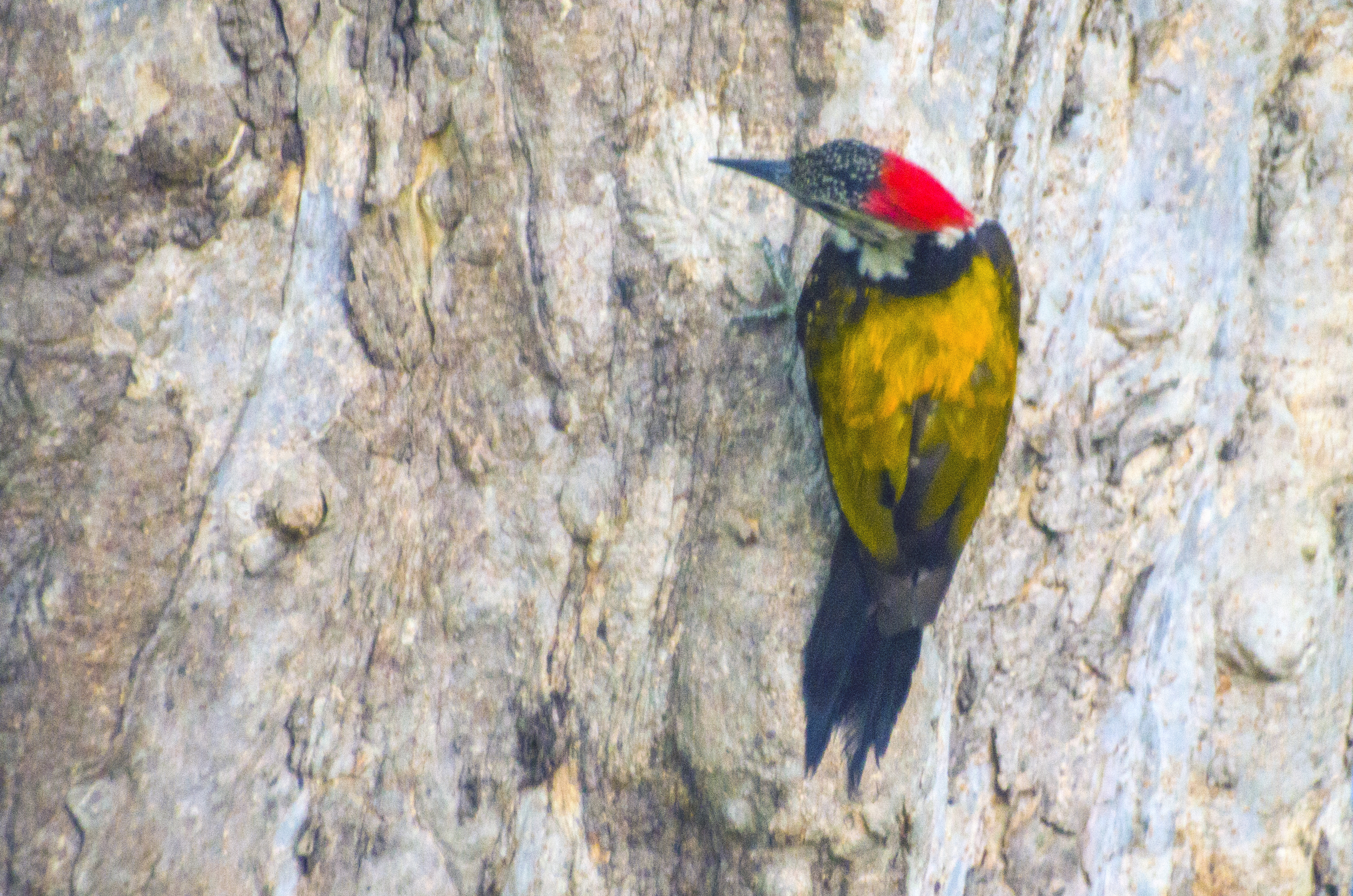
At Salt Lake, Kolkata

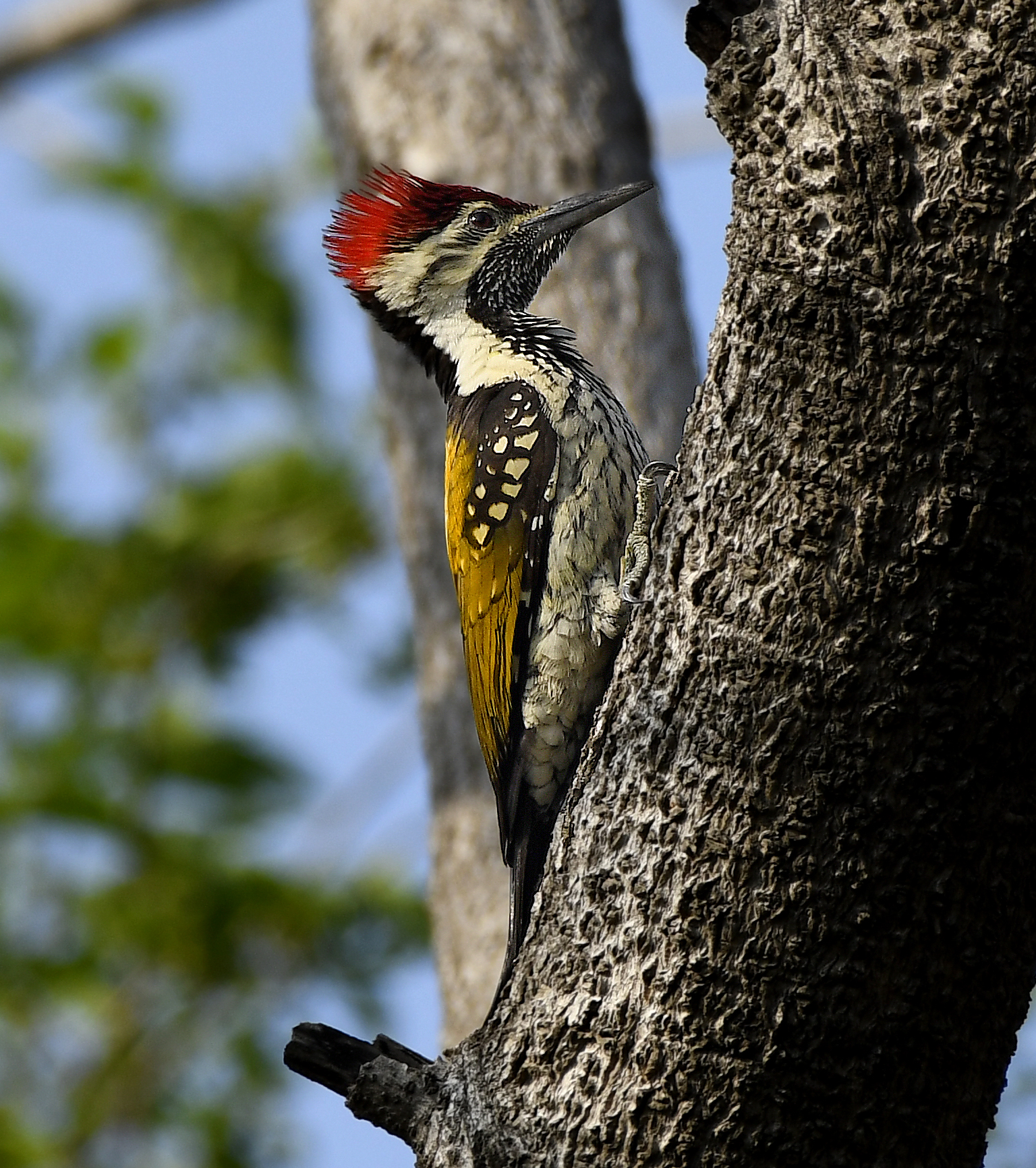
Black-rumped flameback at New Delhi, India

The black-rumped flameback is a large species at 26–29 cm in length. It has a typical woodpecker shape, and the golden yellow wing coverts are distinctive. The rump is black and not red as in the greater flameback. The underparts are white with dark chevron markings. The black throat finely marked with white immediately separates it from other golden backed woodpeckers in the Indian region. The head is whitish with a black nape and throat, and there is a greyish eye patch. Unlike the greater flameback it has no dark moustachial stripes. The adult male has a red crown and crest. Females have a black forecrown spotted with white, with red only on the rear crest. Young birds are like the female, but duller.

A Black-rumped flameback in Thiruvananthapuram, Kerala, India

Like other woodpeckers, this species has a straight pointed bill, a stiff tail to provide support against tree trunks, and zygodactyl feet, with two toes pointing forward, and two backward. The long tongue can be darted forward to capture insects.

The black-rumped flameback is the only golden-backed woodpecker with both a black throat and a black rump.

Leucistic birds have been recorded. Two specimens of male birds from the northern Western Ghats have been noted to have red-tipped feathers on the malar region almost forming a malar stripe. A female specimen from Lucknow has been noted to have grown an abnormal downcurved hoopoe-like bill.

== Distribution and habitat ==
This flameback is found mainly on the plains going up to an elevation of about 1200m in Pakistan, India south of the Himalayas and east till the western Assam valley and Meghalaya, Bangladesh and Sri Lanka. It is associated with open forest and cultivation. They are often seen in urban areas with wooded avenues. It is somewhat rare in the Kutch and desert region of Rajasthan.

== Behaviour and ecology ==
This species is normally seen in pairs or small parties and sometimes joins mixed-species foraging flocks. They forage from the ground to the canopy. They feed on insects mainly beetle larvae from under the bark, visit termite mounds and sometimes feed on nectar. As they make hopping movements around branches, they often conceal themselves from potential predators. They adapt well in human-modified habitats making use of artificial constructions fallen fruits and even food scraps.

The breeding season varies with weather and is between February and July. They frequently drum during the breeding season. The nest hole is usually excavated by the birds and has a horizontal entrance and descends into a cavity. Sometimes birds may usurp the nest holes of other birds. Nests have also been noted in mud embankments. The eggs are laid inside the unlined cavity. The normal clutch is three and the eggs are elongate and glossy white. The eggs hatch after about 11 days of incubation. The chicks leave the nest after about 20 days.

== In culture ==
In Sri Lanka these woodpeckers go by the generic name of kæralaa in Sinhala. In some parts of the island, it is also called kottoruwa although it more often refers to barbets. This bird appears in a 4.50 rupee Sri Lankan postal stamp. It also appears in a 3.75 Taka postal stamp from Bangladesh.

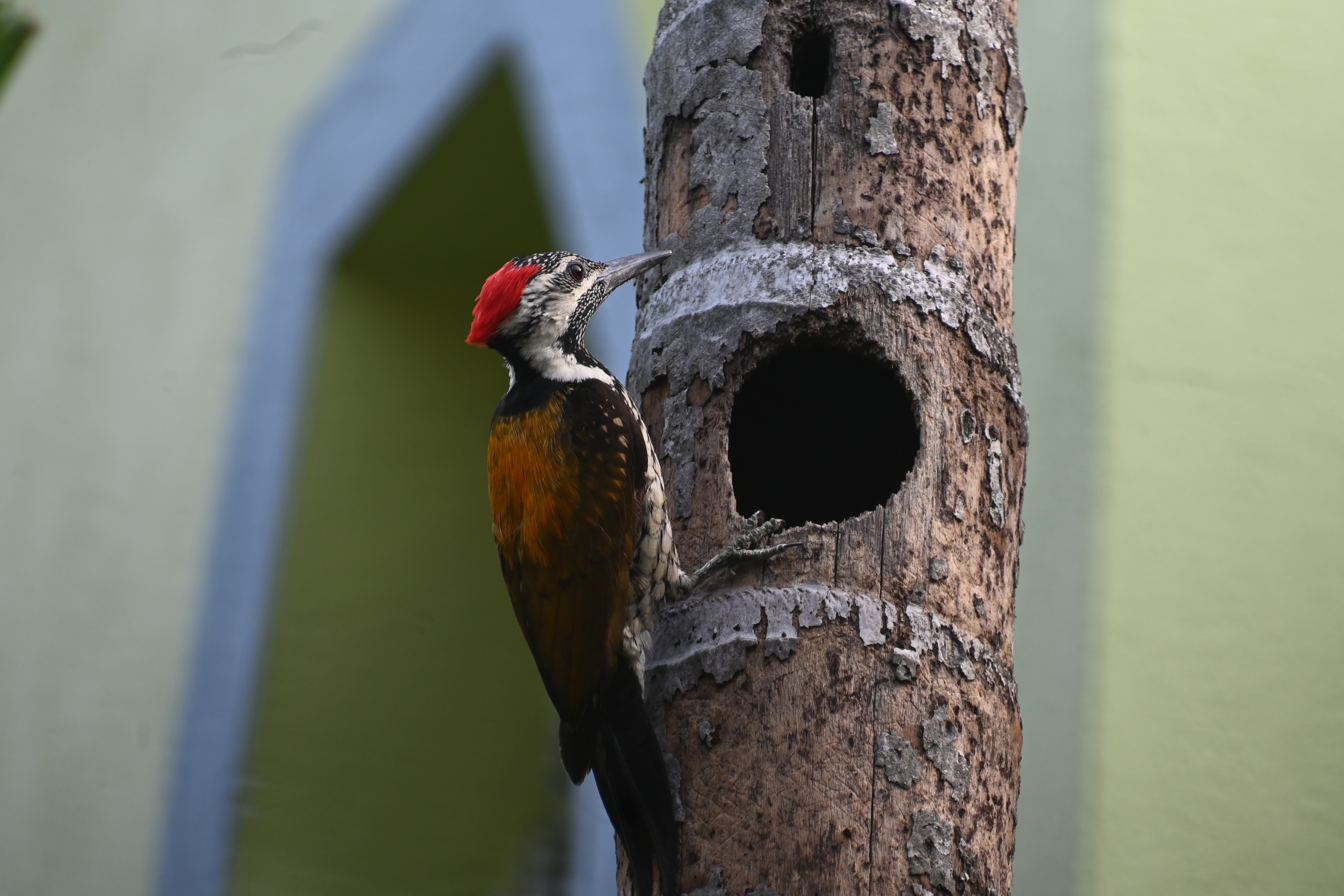
Black-rumped flameback in Naihati, West Bengal
