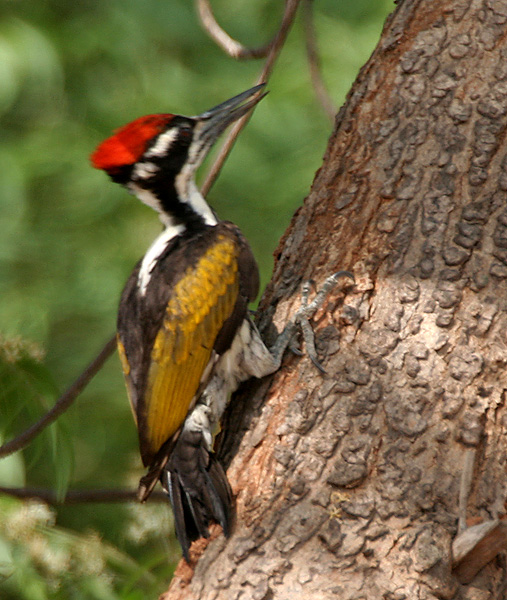
- White-naped woodpecker (Chrysocolaptes festivus)

Scientific classification
- Kingdom: Animalia
- Phylum: Chordata
- Class: Aves
- Order: Piciformes
- Family: Picidae
- Tribe: Campephilini
- Genus: Chrysocolaptes; Blyth, 1843

Type species
- Picus strictus Horsfield, 1821

Species
- see text

= Chrysocolaptes =

Genus of birds

Chrysocolaptes is a genus of birds in the woodpecker family Picidae that are found in South and Southeast Asia.

== Taxonomy ==
The genus was introduced by English zoologist Edward Blyth in 1843. The type species was subsequently designated as the Javan flameback (Chrysocolaptes strictus) by Scottish ornithologist Edward Hargitt in 1890. The genus name combines the Ancient Greek khrusos meaning "gold" and kolaptēs meaning "chiseller". The genus belongs to the tribe Campephilini in the subfamily Picinae.

== Species ==
The genus contains ten species:

Image	Scientific name	Common name	Distribution
	Chrysocolaptes festivus	White-naped woodpecker	India and Sri Lanka
	Chrysocolaptes guttacristatus	Greater flameback	Himalayas, ne India to Southern China, the Malay Peninsula, Sumatra, western and central Java, and northeast Borneo
	Chrysocolaptes socialis	Malabar flameback	Southwest India
	Chrysocolaptes stricklandi	Crimson-backed flameback	Sri Lanka
	Chrysocolaptes strictus	Javan flameback	Java, Bali, and Kangean Islands
	Chrysocolaptes haematribon	Luzon flameback	Luzon, Polillo, Catanduanes, and Marinduque, the Philippines
	Chrysocolaptes xanthocephalus	Yellow-faced flameback	Philippine islands of Negros, Guimaras, Panay, Masbate, and Ticao
	Chrysocolaptes lucidus	Buff-spotted flameback	Philippine islands of Bohol, Leyte, Samar, Biliran, Panaon, Mindanao, Basilan, and Samal
	Chrysocolaptes erythrocephalus	Red-headed flameback	Philippine islands of Balabac, Palawan, Busuanga, and Calamian
	Chrysocolaptes validus	Orange-backed woodpecker	Malay Peninsula, Sumatra, Borneo and Java
