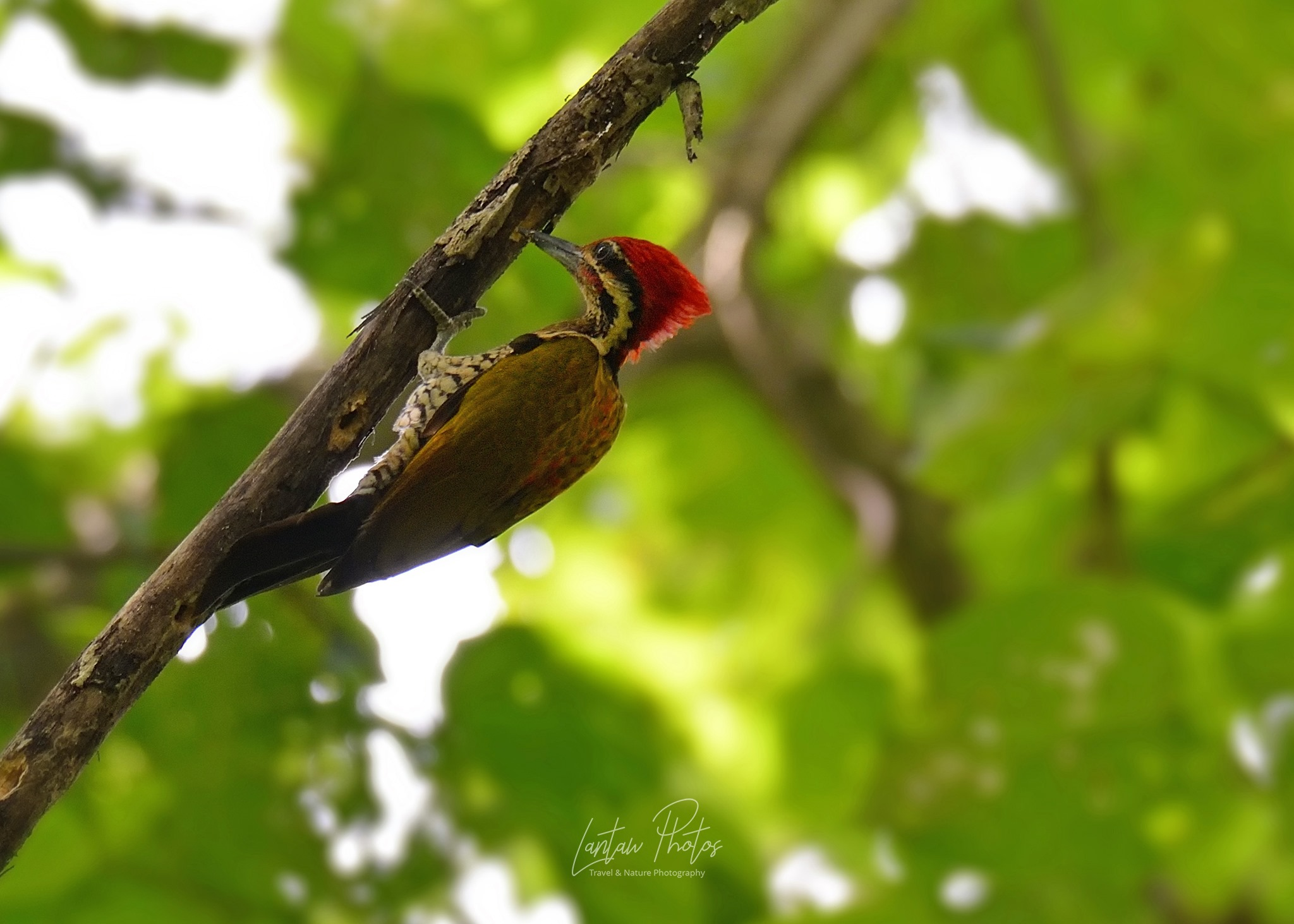
- Male
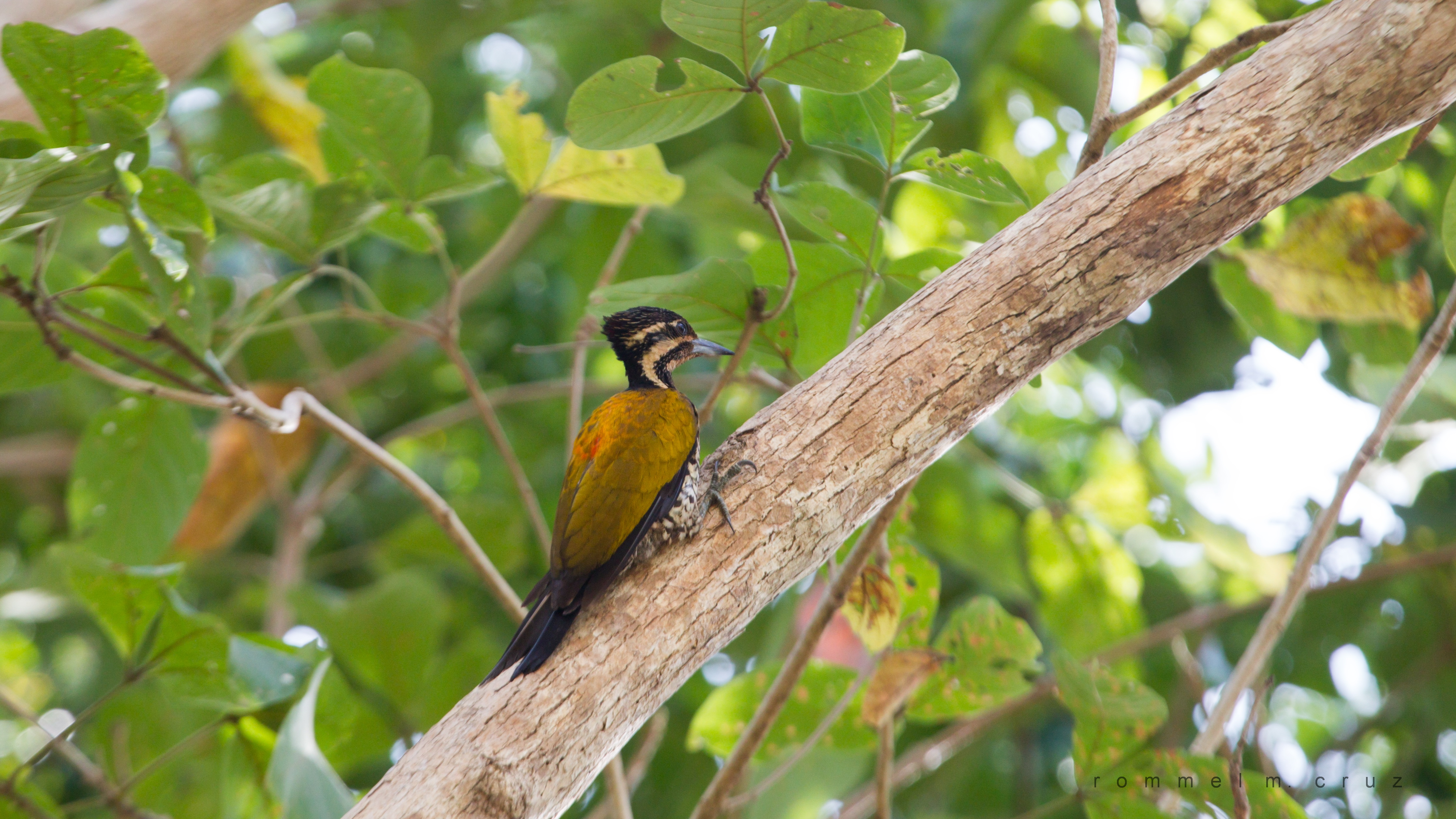
- Female

Conservation status
- Near Threatened (IUCN 3.1)

Scientific classification
- Kingdom: Animalia
- Phylum: Chordata
- Class: Aves
- Order: Piciformes
- Family: Picidae
- Genus: Dinopium
- Species: D. everetti

Binomial name
- Dinopium everetti (Tweeddale, 1878)

= Spot-throated flameback =

Species of bird

The spot-throated flameback (Dinopium everetti) is a species of bird in the family Picidae. It is endemic to the Philippines only being found in the province of Palawan in the islands of Balabac, Busuanga and Calamian and mainland Palawan.. It is sometimes considered a subspecies of the common flameback.It is found in moist lowland forests including primary, secondary and even plantations and clearings provided there are still standing trees. It is threatened by habitat loss.

== Description ==
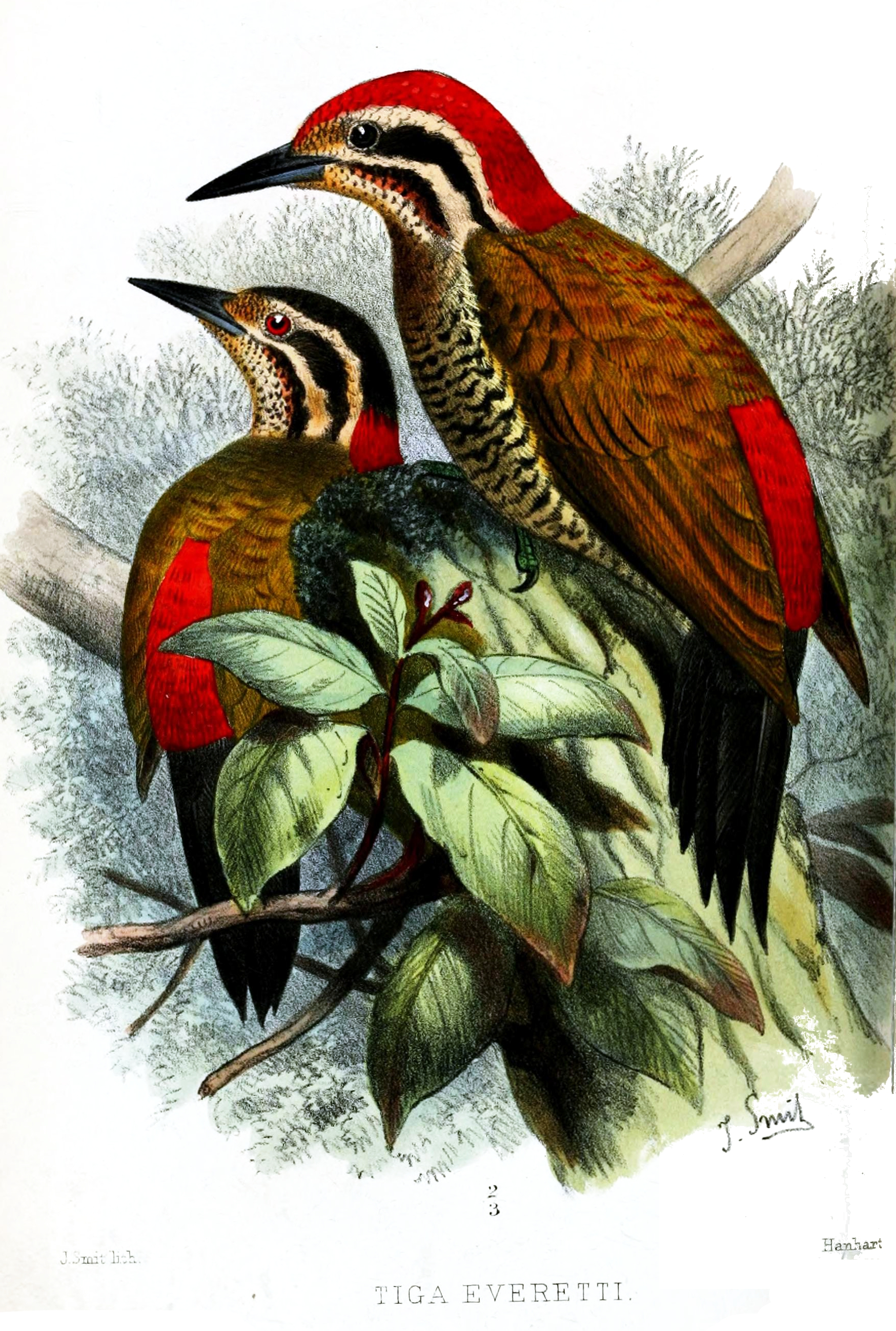
An illustration of a female (left) and male (right)

== Taxonomy ==
Formerly conspecific with the Common flameback but differs in much smaller white eyestripe or supercilium, more mottled underparts and the females have a red nape versus the Common flamebacks black nape.

== Ecology and behavior ==
Not much is known about this species specific diet but based on other flameback species it is presumed to feed on large caterpillars, wood-boring larvaes, pupaes and ants. It is often seen foraging on larger trees and snags pecking and hammering the wood to find insects. Often seen in pairs or small family groups and even with White-bellied woodpecker and Red-headed flameback.

Nests in tree cavities. Breeding is believed to occur from March to April. The better studied and similar Common flameback lays 2 to 3 eggs.

== Habitat and conservation status ==
The flameback occurs in forests and open woodlands, including coconut plantations, indicating some tolerance for human-altered habitat, but the species is considered uncommon. It typically inhabits the lowlands, with breeding reported March and April.

IUCN has assessed this bird as near-threatened. with the population being estimated at 2,500 to 9,999 mature individuals. This species' main threat is habitat loss.

Lowland forest loss, degradation and fragmentation have been extensive and are ongoing on Palawan and logging and mining concessions have been granted for most remaining forest tracts on the island. Illegal logging is thought to persist across much of the south.

It is recommended to determine its precise ecological requirements and its ability to persist in degraded and fragmented habitats. Ensure the effective protection of existing protected areas in which it occurs.
