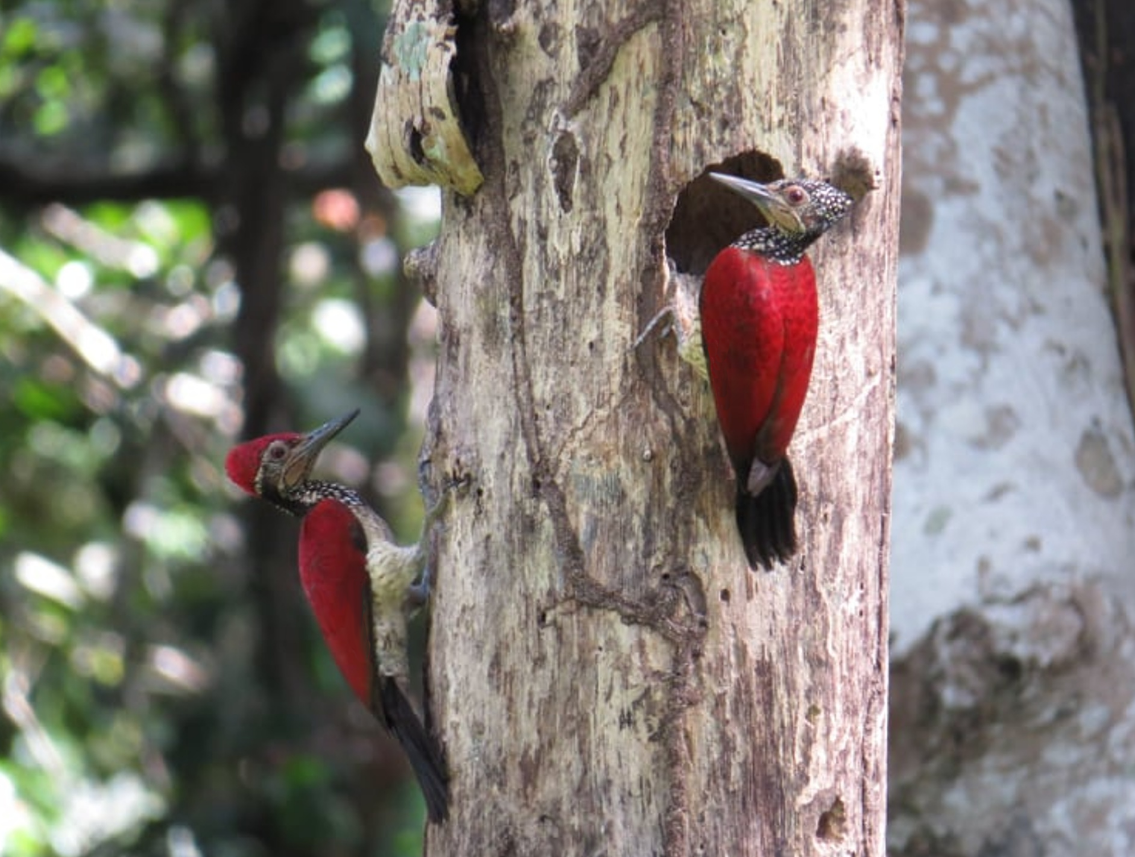
- Male (left) and female (right)

Conservation status
- Least Concern (IUCN 3.1)

Scientific classification
- Kingdom: Animalia
- Phylum: Chordata
- Class: Aves
- Order: Piciformes
- Family: Picidae
- Genus: Chrysocolaptes
- Species: C. haematribon

Binomial name
- Chrysocolaptes haematribon (Wagler, 1827)
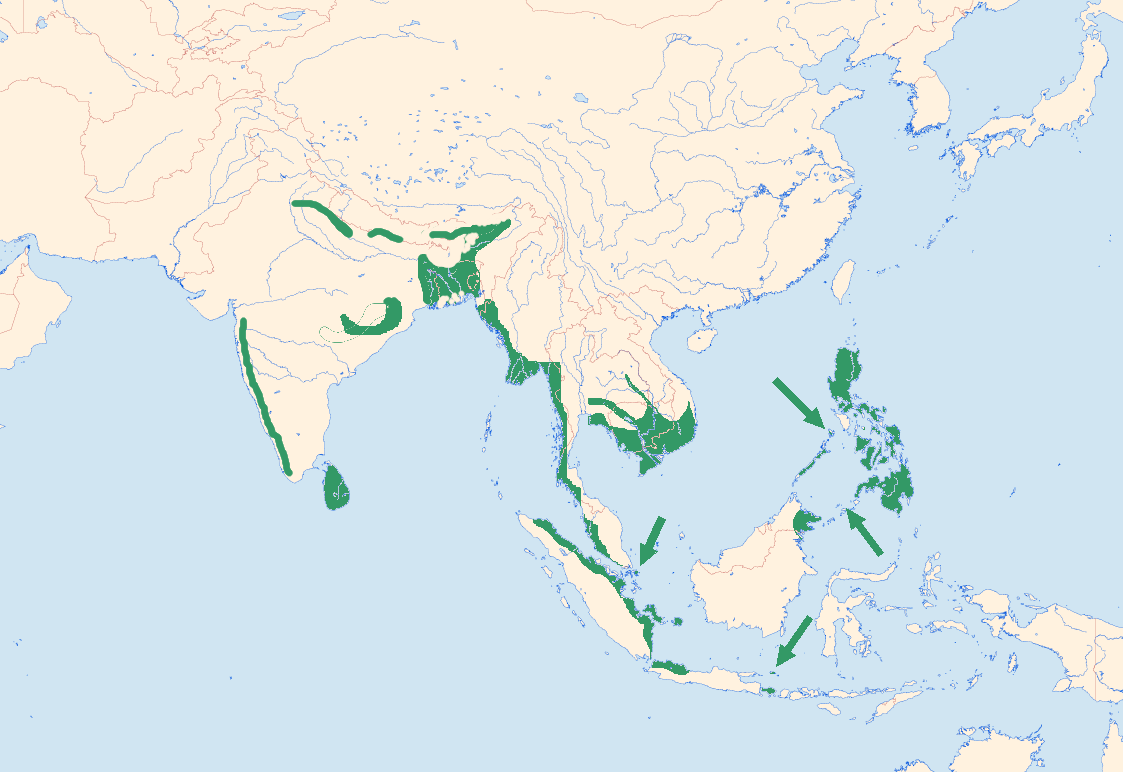

= Luzon flameback =

Species of bird

The Luzon flameback (Chrysocolaptes haematribon) is a species of bird in the family Picidae. It is found on the northern islands of Luzon, Polillo, Catanduanes and Marinduque, Philippines. It is sometimes considered a subspecies of the greater flameback.

== Description ==
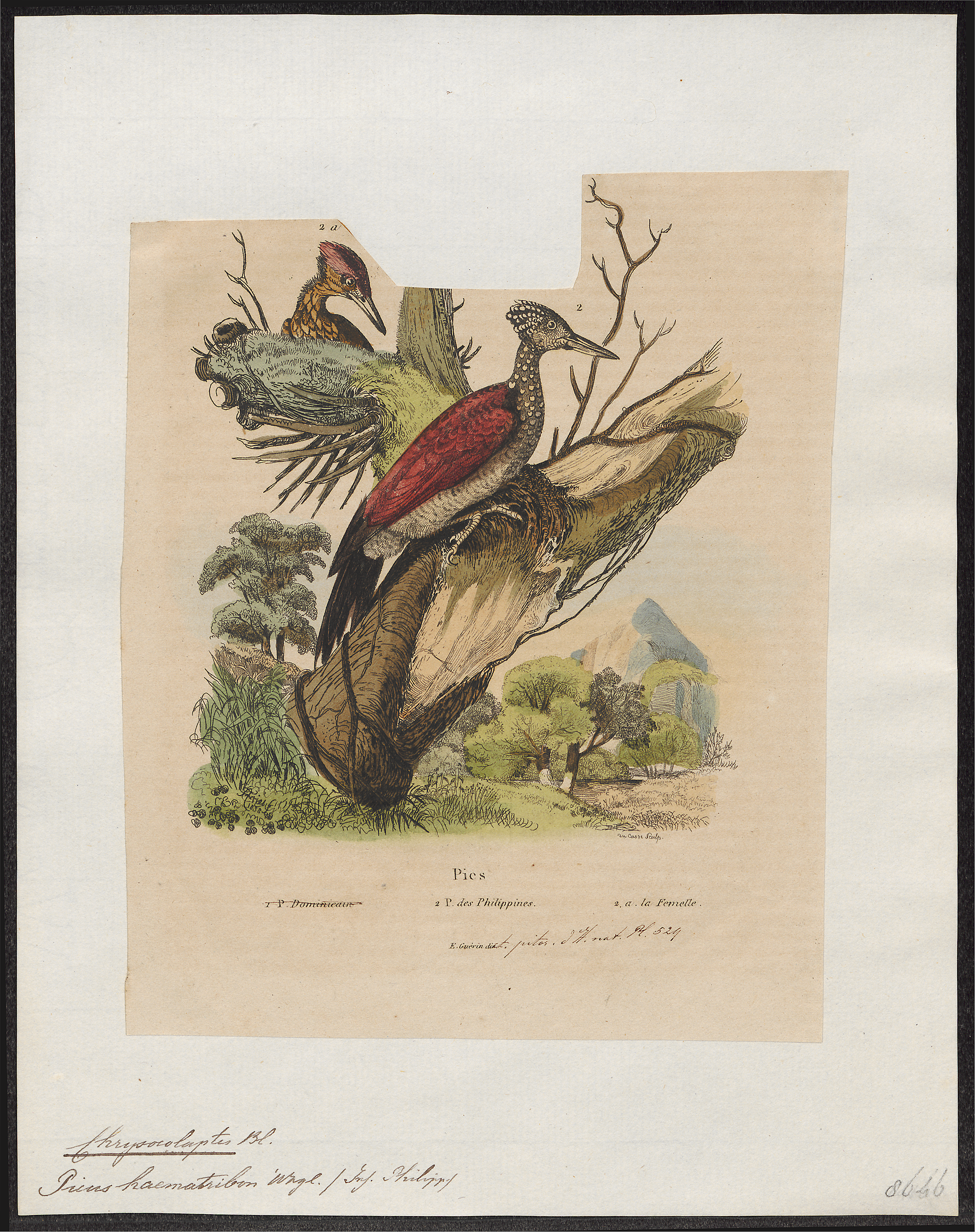
An illustration made in 1883

Large sized woodpecker with a red back hence the name and a yellowish belly. Males and females are sexually dimorphic. Males have a red crest while the females have a more drab black crest with white spots.

== Taxonomy ==
This species is part of the Greater flameback species complex which has now been split into 8 distinct species. This species differs from its most closely related Buff-spotted flameback as females have black crowns in females, a heavily spotted throat and soft barring on its belly to vent

This species is monotypic. .

== Ecology and behavior ==
Not much is known about this species specific diet but based on other flameback species it is presumed to feed on large caterpillars, wood-boring larvaes, pupaes and ants. It is often seen foraging on larger trees and snags pecking and hammering the wood to find insects. Often seen in pairs or small family groups and even with White-bellied woodpecker and Northern sooty woodpecker.

Nests in tree cavities. Breeding is believed to occur from January to May. The very similar and well studied Greater flameback lays 2 to 5 eggs which incubate in 2 weeks and fledge within a month.

== Habitat and conservation status ==
Its natural habitats are tropical moist lowland forests and less often on tropical moist montane forests up to 1,500 masl. It is threatened by habitat loss, and the illegal wildlife trade. It is possibly extinct on Marinduque

IUCN has assessed this bird as a Least-concern species as it remains locally common in suitable habitat. This species is believed to be declining due to habitat loss.

It is found in multiple protected areas such as Mount Banahaw, Mount Makiling, Mount Isarog, Bataan National Park and Northern Sierra Madre Natural Park but like all areas in the Philippines, protection is lax and deforestation and hunting continues despite this protection on paper.
