= Crimson-backed flameback =

Conservation status
- Least Concern (IUCN 3.1)

Scientific classification
- Kingdom: Animalia
- Phylum: Chordata
- Class: Aves
- Order: Piciformes
- Family: Picidae
- Genus: Chrysocolaptes
- Species: C. stricklandi

Binomial name
- Chrysocolaptes stricklandi (Layard, 1854)
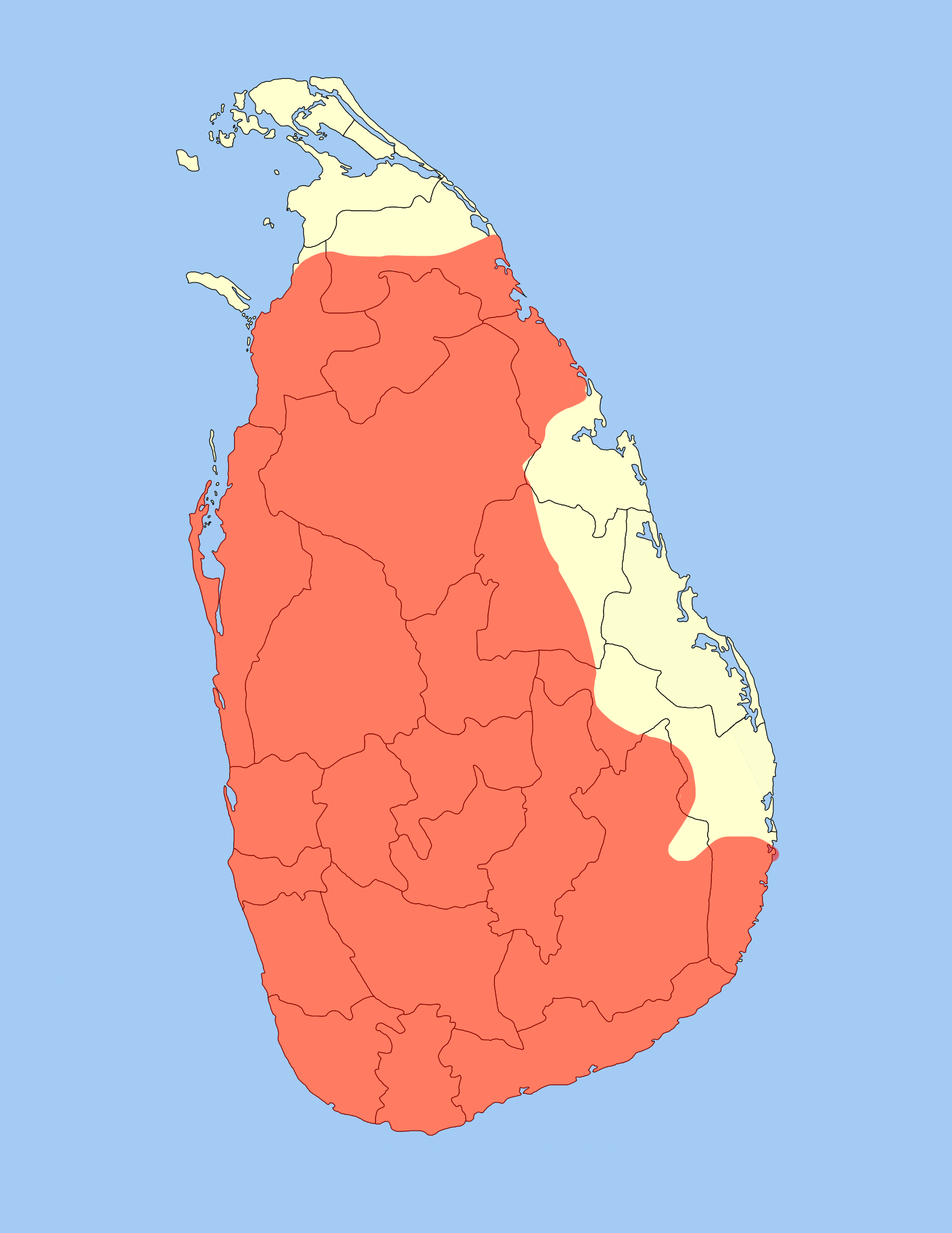

Synonyms
- Brachypternus stricklandi

Species of bird

The crimson-backed flameback or greater Sri Lanka flameback (Chrysocolaptes stricklandi) is a species of bird in the woodpecker family Picidae that is endemic to Sri Lanka.

The crimson-backed flameback and the greater flameback (Chrysocolaptes guttacristatus) were both formerly considered as subspecies of the buff-spotted flameback (Chrysocolaptes lucidus).

Nigel Collar (2011, p. 33) notes the differences between Chrysocolaptes stricklandi and Chrysocolaptes guttacristatus as being that the former has a crimson rather than golden upper body plumage, a yellow rather than a black beak, a weaker supramoustachial stripe and a less noticeable, even spotty, eyebrow stripe.

== Notes ==
It takes its binomial name (formerly Brachypternus stricklandi) from Hugh Edwin Strickland (see Layard 1854 p. 29).
