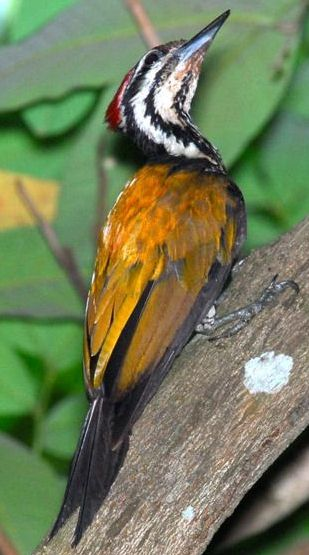
- Common flameback (Dinopium javanense)

Scientific classification
- Kingdom: Animalia
- Phylum: Chordata
- Class: Aves
- Order: Piciformes
- Family: Picidae
- Tribe: Picini
- Genus: Dinopium; Rafinesque, 1814

Type species
- Dinopium (Picoides) erythronotus Rafinesque, 1814

Species
- see text

= Dinopium =

Flamebacks

Genus of birds

Dinopium is a genus of birds in the woodpecker family Picidae. The species are found in South and Southeast Asia.

The genus was introduced by the French polymath Constantine Samuel Rafinesque in 1814 to accommodate the common flameback (Dinopium javanense). The name combines the Classical Greek deinos meaning "mighty" or "huge" and ōps/ōpos meaning "appearance".

A large phylogenetic study of the woodpecker family Picidae published in 2017 found that the genus was paraphyletic. The olive-backed woodpecker (Dinopium rafflesii) is more closely related to the pale-headed woodpecker (Gecinulus grantia) than it is to other members of the genus Dinopium.

== Species ==
As presently constituted, the genus contains the following 5 species:

Image	Scientific name	Common name	Distribution
	Dinopium shorii	Himalayan flameback	Bangladesh, Bhutan, India, Myanmar, and Nepal
	Dinopium javanense	Common flameback	Bangladesh, Brunei, Cambodia, China, India, Indonesia, Laos, Malaysia, Myanmar, Singapore, Thailand, and Vietnam
	Dinopium everetti	Spot-throated flameback	island of Palawan in the Philippines.
	Dinopium benghalense	Black-rumped flameback	Pakistan, India south of the Himalayas and east till the western Assam valley and Meghalaya, Bangladesh and Sri Lanka
	Dinopium psarodes	Red-backed flameback	Sri Lanka
