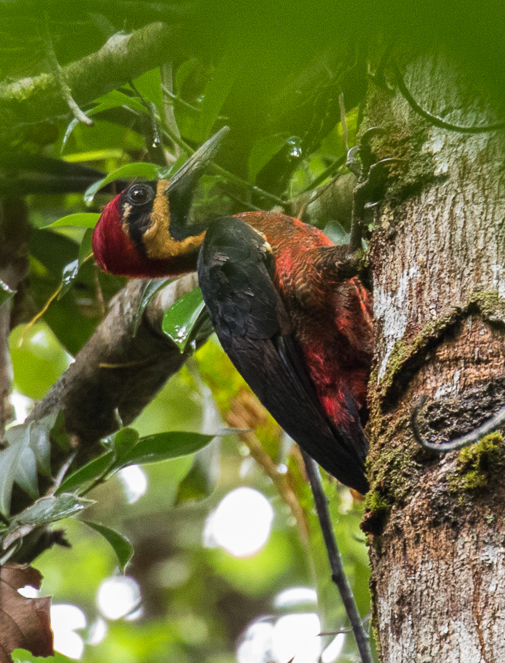

Conservation status
- Near Threatened (IUCN 3.1)

Scientific classification
- Kingdom: Animalia
- Phylum: Chordata
- Class: Aves
- Order: Piciformes
- Family: Picidae
- Genus: Campephilus
- Species: C. splendens

Binomial name
- Campephilus splendens Hargitt, 1889

= Splendid woodpecker =

Species of bird

The splendid woodpecker (Campephilus splendens) is a species of bird in subfamily Picinae of the woodpecker family Picidae. It was formerly considered conspecific with the crimson-bellied woodpecker (C. haematogaster) and some taxonomists retain that treatment. It is found in Colombia, Ecuador, and Panama.

== Taxonomy and systematics ==
For much of its time taxonomists treated what is now the splendid woodpecker as a subspecies of the crimson-bellied woodpecker. From about the year 2000 authors have suggested that splendens was better treated as a separate species. By at least 2018 BirdLife International's Handbook of the Birds of the World (HBW) had recognized the split, and in July 2023 the International Ornithological Committee (IOC) followed suit.

The South American Classification Committee of the American Ornithological Society (SACC) and the Clements taxonomy retain the taxon as a subspecies of the crimson-bellied woodpecker. However, the SACC is seeking a proposal to accept the split.

The splendid woodpecker as recognized by HBW and the IOC as monotypic.

== Description ==
The splendid woodpecker is 33 to 35 cm (13 to 14 in) long and weighs 225 to 250 g (7.9 to 8.8 oz). Both sexes have a red forehead, crown, nape, and hindneck, a thin black line above the eye, a thin buff supercilium behind the eye, a wider black band from the nares through the eye to the red of the nape, and a black chin and upper throat. Males have a wide buff band between the black eye band and chin; on females the rear of the band extends down the side of the neck to the upper breast. Both sexes' scapulars and upper back are black to brownish black, their lower back and rump are deep red, and their uppertail coverts and tail are black. Their wings' upper surface is black with three white spots on most of the flight feathers. The wings' underside is blackish with pale bars. Their lower throat and upper breast are red and their lower breast and belly are red with dusky barring. Juveniles resemble adults but are duller and browner with a sooty forehead and less red on their underparts.

== Distribution and habitat ==
The splendid woodpecker is found in Panama along the whole Caribbean slope and from Panamá Province on the Pacific side and through western Colombia into western Ecuador. The species mostly inhabits the interior of humid and wet forest and montane forest though it also is found along the forest edge. In elevation it ranges from near sea level to 1,600 m (5,200 ft) in Panama, to 1,100 m (3,600 ft) in Colombia, and to about 800 m (2,600 ft) in Ecuador.

== Behavior ==
=== Movement ===
The splendid woodpecker is a year-round resident throughout its range.

=== Feeding ===
The splendid woodpecker's diet is mostly adults and larvae of large beetles, though other insects are also taken. It usually forages near the ground on the trunks of large trees, by itself or in pairs, hammering and probing to reach the prey.

=== Breeding ===
The splendid woodpecker's breeding season appears to include March to May in Panama and September to April in Colombia and Ecuador. Nothing else is known about its breeding biology.

=== Vocal and non-vocal sounds ===
The splendid woodpecker's song is "a repetition of harsh, nasal, squeaky but loud eer notes". Its call is a loud "stk". It drums with "a rapid, heavy double rap".

== Status ==
The IUCN has assessed the splendid woodpecker as Near Threatened. It has a large range but its population size is not known and is believed to be decreasing. "Threats include intensive logging, human settlement, cattle-grazing, mining and coca and palm cultivation." It is considered rare in Panama, rare to uncommon in Colombia, and rare to locally uncommon in Ecuador. It does occur in at least one protected area in each of Colombia and Ecuador.
