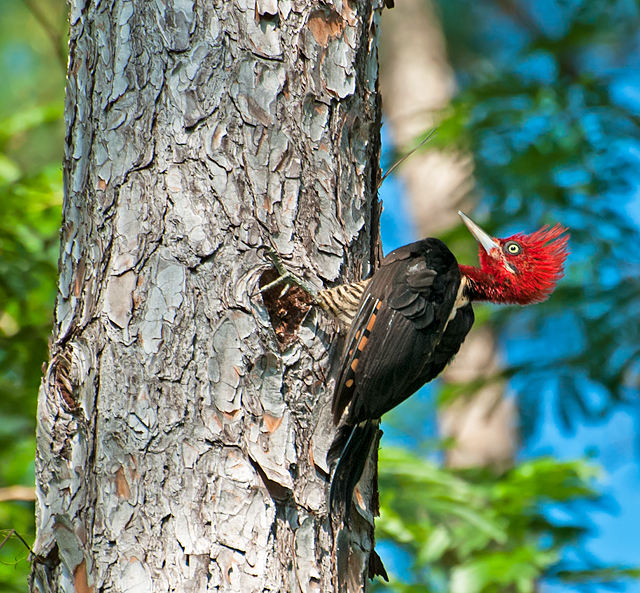

Conservation status
- Least Concern (IUCN 3.1)

Scientific classification
- Kingdom: Animalia
- Phylum: Chordata
- Class: Aves
- Order: Piciformes
- Family: Picidae
- Genus: Campephilus
- Species: C. robustus

Binomial name
- Campephilus robustus (Lichtenstein, MHC, 1818)

= Robust woodpecker =

Species of bird

The robust woodpecker (Campephilus robustus) is a species of bird in subfamily Picinae of the woodpecker family Picidae. It is found in Argentina, Brazil, and Paraguay.

== Taxonomy and systematics ==
The robust woodpecker was for a time placed in genus Scapaneus that was later merged into genus Phloeoceastes that was itself merged into the current genus Campephilus. The robust woodpecker is monotypic.

== Description ==
The robust woodpecker is 32 to 37 cm (13 to 15 in) long and weighs 230 to 294 g (8.1 to 10 oz). Both sexes have whitish upperparts with a pale buff or cinnamon tinge. Their scapulars and the wings' coverts and upper surface are black with small rusty-buff spots on the flight feathers' inner webs. The wings' underside is blackish brown with rufous-buff spots on the flight feathers. Their tail is black . Their underparts are buff to whitish buff with black bars that are narrower on the belly. Adult males have an entirely red head and neck with a small black and white spot on the ear coverts. Adult females do not have the covert spot. They do have a wide whitish strip with black edges that extends from the bill to the ear coverts. The adult's bill is a long horn-colored chisel, their iris white to yellow-white, and their legs dark gray. Juveniles resemble adults but are duller and browner; their upperparts are whiter and their underparts have less contrast.

== Distribution and habitat ==
The robust woodpecker is found in eastern Brazil from Bahia and Goiás south to Rio Grande do Sul, in eastern Paraguay, and in northeastern Argentina's Misiones and Corrientes provinces. It inhabits intact humid and Araucaria moist forests; it shuns disturbed forest unless large trees remain. In elevation it ranges from sea level to 2,200 m (7,200 ft).

== Behavior ==
=== Movement ===
The robust woodpecker is a year-round resident throughout its range.

=== Feeding ===
The robust woodpecker forages at all levels of the forest with some preference for the middle level; it only rarely feeds on the ground. It tends to hunt on tree trunks and the bases of limbs, where it pecks and hammers vigorously and also probes and flakes off bark. It tends to forage singly, in pairs, or in family groups, and only rarely joins mixed species feeding flocks. Its diet is mostly adult and larval beetles but also includes some berries.

=== Breeding ===
One robust woodpecker nest was observed during excavation in May; it held young in July. Nothing else is known about the species' breeding biology.

=== Vocal and non-vocal sounds ===
One robust woodpecker vocalization is a "psó-ko po-po-po-po-rrat" series. Two calls are "kee" and "kew" that are given both in flight and while perched. Its drum is a double tap "to-plóp" or "thump-ump".

== Status ==
The IUCN has assessed the robust woodpecker as being of Least Concern. It has a somewhat limited range and an unknown population size, but the latter is believed to be increasing. No immediate threats have been identified. It occurs in many state and national parks and preserves. However, it is "considered to be highly sensitive to forest fragmentation [and] requires research on its ecology and breeding."
