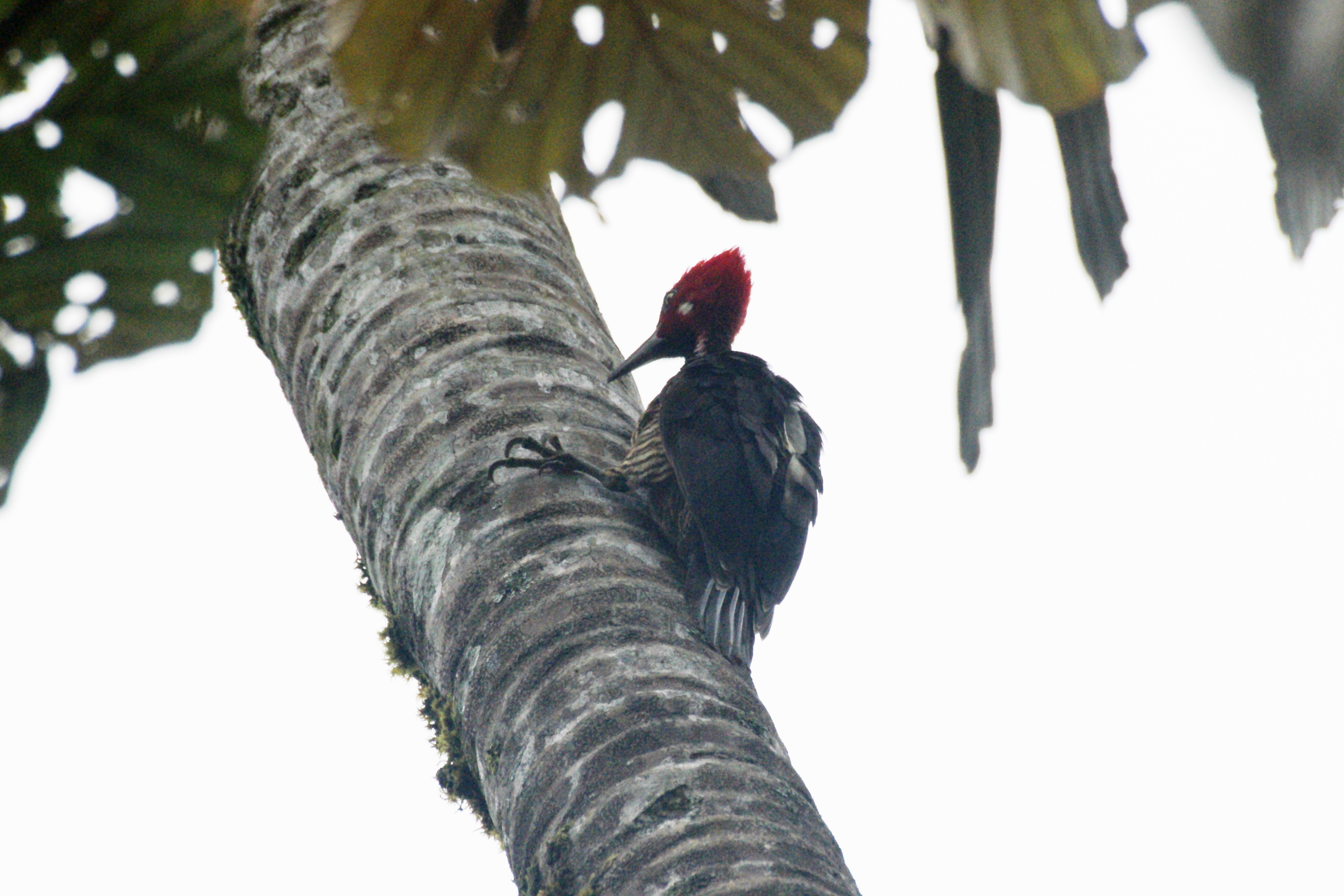

Conservation status
- Least Concern (IUCN 3.1)

Scientific classification
- Kingdom: Animalia
- Phylum: Chordata
- Class: Aves
- Order: Piciformes
- Family: Picidae
- Genus: Campephilus
- Species: C. gayaquilensis

Binomial name
- Campephilus gayaquilensis (Lesson, 1845)

= Guayaquil woodpecker =

Species of bird

The Guayaquil woodpecker (Campephilus gayaquilensis) is a woodpecker from the subfamily Picinae.

== Taxonomy and systematics ==
The Guayaquil woodpecker was for a time placed in genus Scapaneus that was later merged into genus Phloeoceastes that was itself merged into the current genus Campephilus. The Guayaquil woodpecker is monotypic.

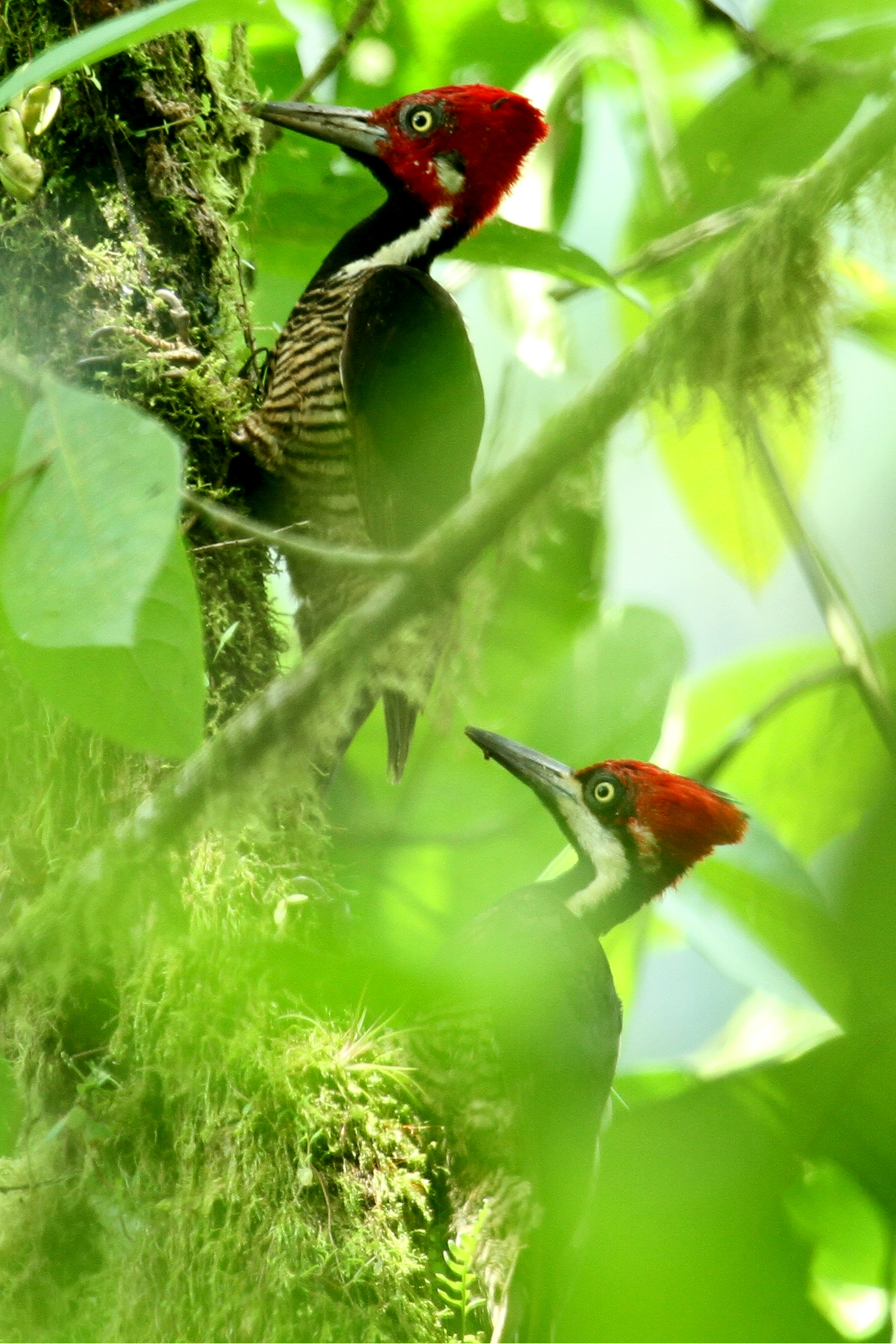
Umbrella Bird Lodge, Buonaventura Reserve, Ecuador (female below)

== Description ==
The Guayaquil woodpecker is 32 to 34 cm (13 to 13 in) long and weighs 230 to 253 g (8.1 to 8.9 oz). Both sexes' upperparts are black from their neck to upper back; their lower back to the uppertail coverts is barred with whitish buff and blackish. Their neck has white stripes on the side that continue onto the upper back and meet as a "V". Their wings' upper surface is brownish black to black; the flight feathers are browner with small cinnamon or buff spots on their inner webs. The underside of the wings' feathers are white with brown tips and trailing edges and pale cinnamon bases on the primaries. Their tail is dark brown to black-brown. Their throat and upper breast are black and the rest of their underparts whitish buff to pale cinnamon-buff with browish black bars. Adult males have an entirely red head with a small black and white spot on the ear coverts. Adult females do not have the covert spot. They do have a wide creamy stripe with black edges that extends from the bill to the ear coverts and bends down to meet the white neck stripe. The adult's bill is a long grayish chisel with a paler mandible, their iris pale yellow, and their legs gray-brown to greenish gray. Juveniles resemble adults but have less barring on the rump and underparts; males' heads resemble the adult female's and females have more black than they do as adults.

== Distribution and habitat ==
The Guayaquil woodpecker is found from southwestern Colombia's Cauca Department south through Ecuador west of the Andes into northwestern Peru's Department of Cajamarca. It inhabits the interior and edges of dry to humid deciduous forest and also mature secondary forest. In elevation it ranges as high as 1,100 m (3,600 ft) in Colombia and 1,500 m (4,900 ft) in Ecuador and Peru, but there mostly below 800 m (2,600 ft).

== Behavior ==
=== Movement ===
The Guayaquil woodpecker is a year-round resident throughout its range.

=== Feeding ===
The Guayaquil woodpecker often forages in pairs, and usually in the forest canopy. Its diet has not been documented but is likely similar to that of the closely related crimson-crested woodpecker (C. melanoleucos), which see here.

=== Breeding ===
The Guayaquil woodpecker's breeding season has not been defined but includes at least October and May. Nothing else is known about its breeding biology.

=== Vocal and non-vocal sounds ===
The Guayaquil woodpecker's most common call is "a liquid, rolling "kwi-kwi-kwe-rrrrrrr"". When excited it utters ""kwik-kwik-kwikerrr" and "kik-kwiddit" notes". Its drum is "a one-second long roll comprising 4–7 strikes (typically six), the first loud and forceful, the rest weaker".

== Status ==
The IUCN has assessed the Guayaquil woodpecker as being of Least Concern. It has a fairly large range and an estimated population of at least 25,000 mature individuals, though the latter is believed to be decreasing. The main threat is forest clearance and fragmentation for agriculture and ranching, but "the species appears to tolerate the degradation and fragmentation of its habitat." It occurs in several protected areas in Ecuador and Peru.
