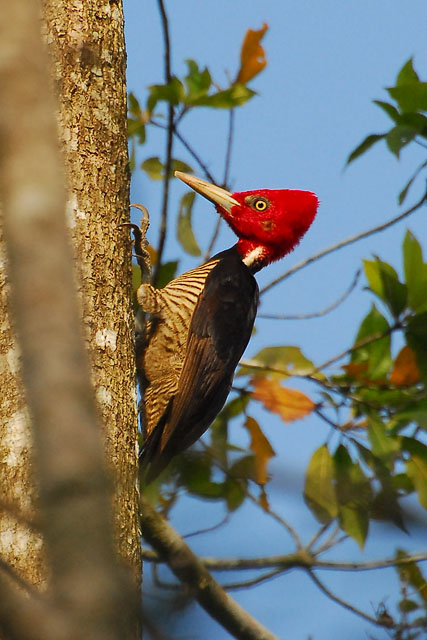
- Pale-billed woodpecker (Campephilus guatemalensis)

Scientific classification
- Kingdom: Animalia
- Phylum: Chordata
- Class: Aves
- Order: Piciformes
- Family: Picidae
- Tribe: Campephilini
- Genus: Campephilus; G.R. Gray, 1840

Type species
- Picus principalis Linnaeus, 1758

Species
- see text

= Campephilus =

Genus of birds

Campephilus is a genus of large American woodpeckers in the family Picidae.

== Taxonomy ==
The genus Campephilus was introduced by English zoologist George Robert Gray in 1840, with the ivory-billed woodpecker (Campephilus principalis) as the type species. The genus name combines the Ancient Greek kampē meaning "caterpillar" and philos meaning "loving". The genus is placed in the tribe Campephilini in the subfamily Picinae and is sister to a clade containing woodpeckers from Southeast Asia in the genera Chrysocolaptes, Blythipicus, and Reinwardtipicus.

== Species ==
The genus contains 12 species:

Image	Common name	Scientific name	Distribution	IUCN status
	Powerful woodpecker	Campephilus pollens	Colombia, Ecuador, Peru, and Venezuela	LC
	Splendid woodpecker	Campephilus splendens	Panama, western Colombia and northwestern Ecuador	LC
	Crimson-bellied woodpecker	Campephilus haematogaster	Colombia, Ecuador, and Peru.	LC
	Red-necked woodpecker	Campephilus rubricollis	Bolivia, Brazil, Colombia, Ecuador, French Guiana, Guyana, Peru, Suriname, and Venezuela.	LC
	Robust woodpecker	Campephilus robustus	Argentina, Brazil, and Paraguay.	LC
	Crimson-crested woodpecker	Campephilus melanoleucos	Panama south to northern border regions of Argentina, and on Trinidad.	LC
	Guayaquil woodpecker	Campephilus gayaquilensis	southern Colombia, Ecuador and northern Peru.	LC
	Pale-billed woodpecker	Campephilus guatemalensis	northern Mexico to western Panama.	LC
	Cream-backed woodpecker	Campephilus leucopogon	Argentina, Bolivia, Brazil, Paraguay and far northwestern Uruguay.	LC
	Magellanic woodpecker	Campephilus magellanicus	southern Chile and southwestern Argentina	LC
	Ivory-billed woodpecker	Campephilus principalis	Southern United States	CR
	Cuban ivory-billed woodpecker	Campephilus principalis bairdii	Cuba	CR (Note: Shares its status with the nominate species)
	(?†) Imperial woodpecker	Campephilus imperialis – possibly extinct (1956 – 2001) (Note: Declared extinct by the Federal Government of Mexico in 2001, but they have a recovery plan in the event of rediscovery.)	Mexico	CR possibly EX

A fossil species, C. dalquesti, was described from bones found in Late Pleistocene deposits of Scurry County, Texas.
