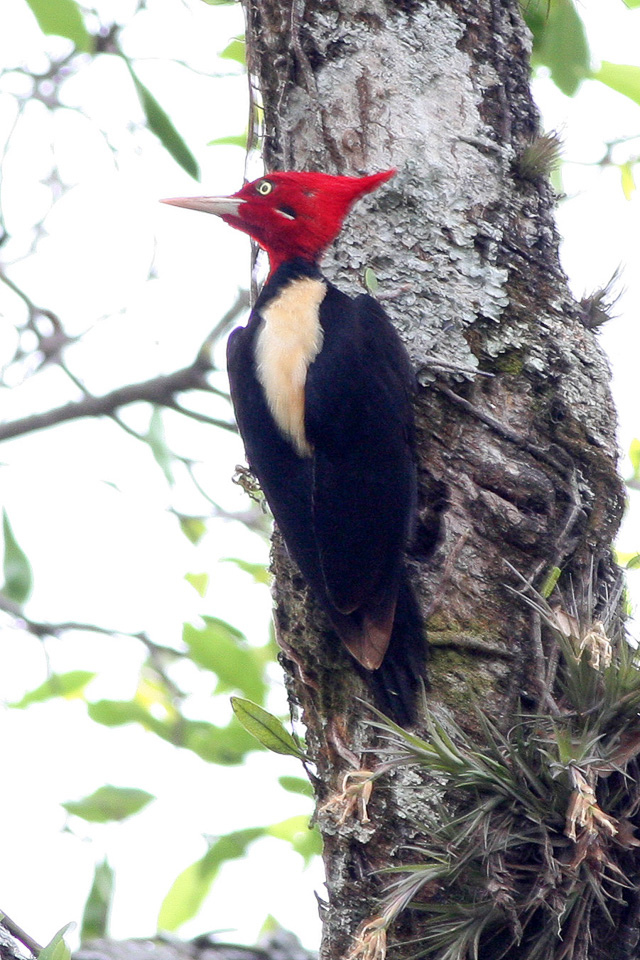

Conservation status
- Least Concern (IUCN 3.1)

Scientific classification
- Kingdom: Animalia
- Phylum: Chordata
- Class: Aves
- Order: Piciformes
- Family: Picidae
- Genus: Campephilus
- Species: C. leucopogon

Binomial name
- Campephilus leucopogon (Valenciennes, 1826)

= Cream-backed woodpecker =

Species of bird

The cream-backed woodpecker (Campephilus leucopogon) is a species of bird in subfamily Picinae of the woodpecker family Picidae. It is found in Argentina, Bolivia, Brazil, Paraguay and Uruguay.

== Taxonomy and systematics ==
The cream-backed woodpecker was for a time placed in genus Scapaneus that was later merged into genus Phloeoceastes that was itself merged into the current genus Campephilus. The cream-backed woodpecker is monotypic.

== Description ==
The cream-backed woodpecker is 28 to 30 cm (11 to 12 in) long and weighs 203 to 281 g (7.2 to 9.9 oz). Adult males have a crest; their head, crest, and neck are entirely red but for a small black and white spot on the ear coverts. Adult females have a longer crest than males and do not have the covert spot. They have a creamy band from the bill to the ear coverts with black above it that surrounds the eye and extends along the front of the crest, and also a thinner black line below the creamy band. The rest of their head is red and their neck is black. Adults of both sexes are mostly black below the neck. They have a whitish upper back with pale cinnamon-buff feather tips and sometimes a few buff and black barred feathers in the center of the back. Their flight feathers have much pale cinnamon on the bases of their inner webs. Their bill is a long ivory chisel, their iris pale yellow, and their legs gray. Juveniles resemble adults but with less red that is more orange. Males resemble adult females with a red crown and crest and females have less red on their head than adults.

== Distribution and habitat ==
The cream-backed woodpecker is found from north-central Bolivia and western and central Paraguay east and south to north central Argentina, northern Uruguay, and southeastern Brazil's Rio Grande do Sul. It inhabits the generally open landscapes of the dry Gran Chaco including savanna, woodlands, transitional forest, pastures with copses of trees, and palm groves. In elevation it ranges up to 2,500 m (8,200 ft).

== Behavior ==
=== Movement ===
The cream-backed woodpecker is a year-round resident throughout its range.

=== Feeding ===
The cream-backed woodpecker's primary food is beetle larvae. It mostly forages in tall trees, often those isolated in otherwise open areas, but will feed on fallen logs. It exposes its prey by hammering and less frequently by pecking and probing. It mostly forages alone except in the breeding season.

=== Breeding ===
The cream-backed woodpecker's breeding season begins in September but is concentrated in October and November. It excavates a nest hole in a tree or palm; the few known ones have been 6 to 8 m (20 to 25 ft) above the ground. Both parents feed nestlings, but other details of parental care, the clutch size, incubation period, and time to fledging are not known.

=== Vocal and non-vocal sounds ===
The cream-backed woodpecker's call is "pi-ow" or "kwee-yaw" that is sometimes repeated. Partners exchange "whirring notes". It also communicates with a quiet "ahem" and various soft and squeaky chattering calls. Its drum is a double tap.

== Status ==
The IUCN has assessed cream-backed woodpecker as being of Least Concern. it has a large range, and though its population size is not known it is believed to be stable. No immediate threats have been identified. It is poorly known and probably not common.
