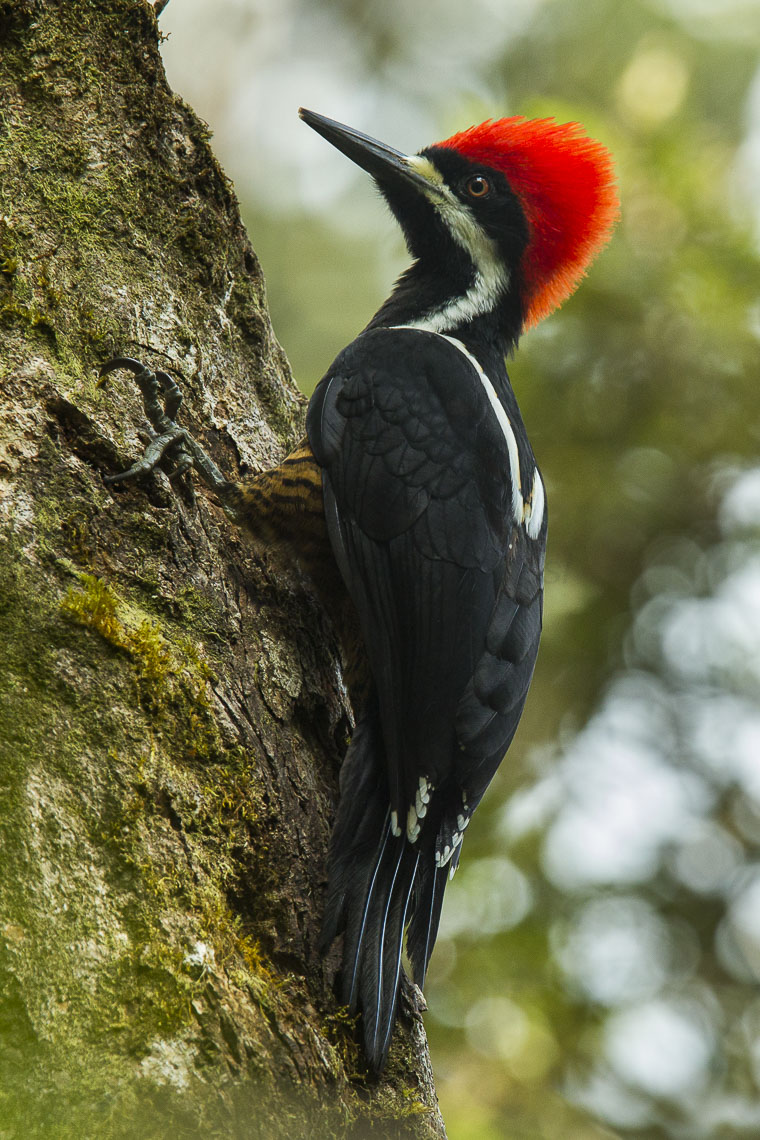

Conservation status
- Least Concern (IUCN 3.1)

Scientific classification
- Kingdom: Animalia
- Phylum: Chordata
- Class: Aves
- Order: Piciformes
- Family: Picidae
- Genus: Campephilus
- Species: C. pollens

Binomial name
- Campephilus pollens (Bonaparte, 1845)

= Powerful woodpecker =

Species of bird

The powerful woodpecker (Campephilus pollens) is a species of bird in subfamily Picinae of the woodpecker family Picidae. It is found in Colombia, Ecuador, Peru, and Venezuela.

== Taxonomy ==
The powerful woodpecker was for a time placed in genus Scapaneus, which was merged into genus Phloeoceastes, which in turn was merged into the current Campephilus. The powerful woodpecker has two subspecies, the nominate C. p. pollens (Bonaparte, 1845) and P. c. peruvianus (Cory, 1915).

== Description ==
The powerful woodpecker is about 32 cm (13 in) long. The sexes differ only on their heads: Adult males are red from their forehead to their crest; females are black there. Both sexes of the nominate subspecies have a black and white face including the throat; the white is a wide band from the lores to below the rear of the ear coverts and from there down the side of the neck. Both sexes have a black hindneck, mantle, scapulars, and upper back with narrow white stripes on either side. Their lower back and rump are white and their uppertail coverts black. Their wings' top surface is black with white tips on the primaries and some white spots or bars on the secondaries. Their wings' undersides are blackish with white bars. Their tail is black. The center of their breast is black and the rest of their underparts are cinnamon-buff with black bars or chevrons. Their bill is a long black chisel, their iris white or pinkish white, and their legs dark gray. Juveniles resemble adults but are duller and browner with more bars on their upperparts and wider ones on their underparts. Subspecies P. c. peruvianus differs from the nominate with a cinnamon-buff lower back and rump, often with black bars, and also often cinnamon-buff bars on the black uppertail coverts.

== Distribution and habitat ==
The nominate subspecies of the powerful woodpecker is found in the Andes from north-central Colombia and southwestern Venezuela south through Ecuador almost to Peru. Subspecies P. c. peruvianus is found on the east slope of the Peruvian Andes as far south as the Department of Junín. The species mostly inhabits the interior and edges of mature montane forest, humid and wet forest, and cloudforest. It also occurs in secondary forest and other more open forest. In elevation it ranges from 900 to 3,750 m (3,000 to 12,300 ft) but is found mostly between 1,700 to 2,600 m (5,600 to 8,500 ft).

== Behavior ==
=== Movement ===
The powerful woodpecker is a year-round resident throughout its range.

=== Feeding ===
The powerful woodpecker forages at all levels of the forest interior, often in pairs. No details of its diet are known.

=== Breeding ===
The powerful woodpecker's breeding season is believed to be from April to August. The only fully described nests were in dead tree trunks. One nest had two eggs and the other a single nestling. At the first nest the incubation period was at least 16 days and fledging occurred 34 to 37 days after hatch. It appears that both parents incubated the eggs.

=== Vocal and non-vocal sounds ===
The powerful woodpecker's most common call is a "nasal 'kyaaah' or 'peeyáw', often repeated". It also makes a "fast 'kikikikikawh'" in flight and a "descending 'kikikiki-keh-keh-kah-kah'" when excited. Its drum is "a brief double tap".

== Status ==
The IUCN has assessed the powerful woodpecker as being of Least Concern. It has a large range, but its population size is not known and is believed to be decreasing. No immediate threats have been identified. It is considered rare to local throughout its range and occurs in a few protected areas.
