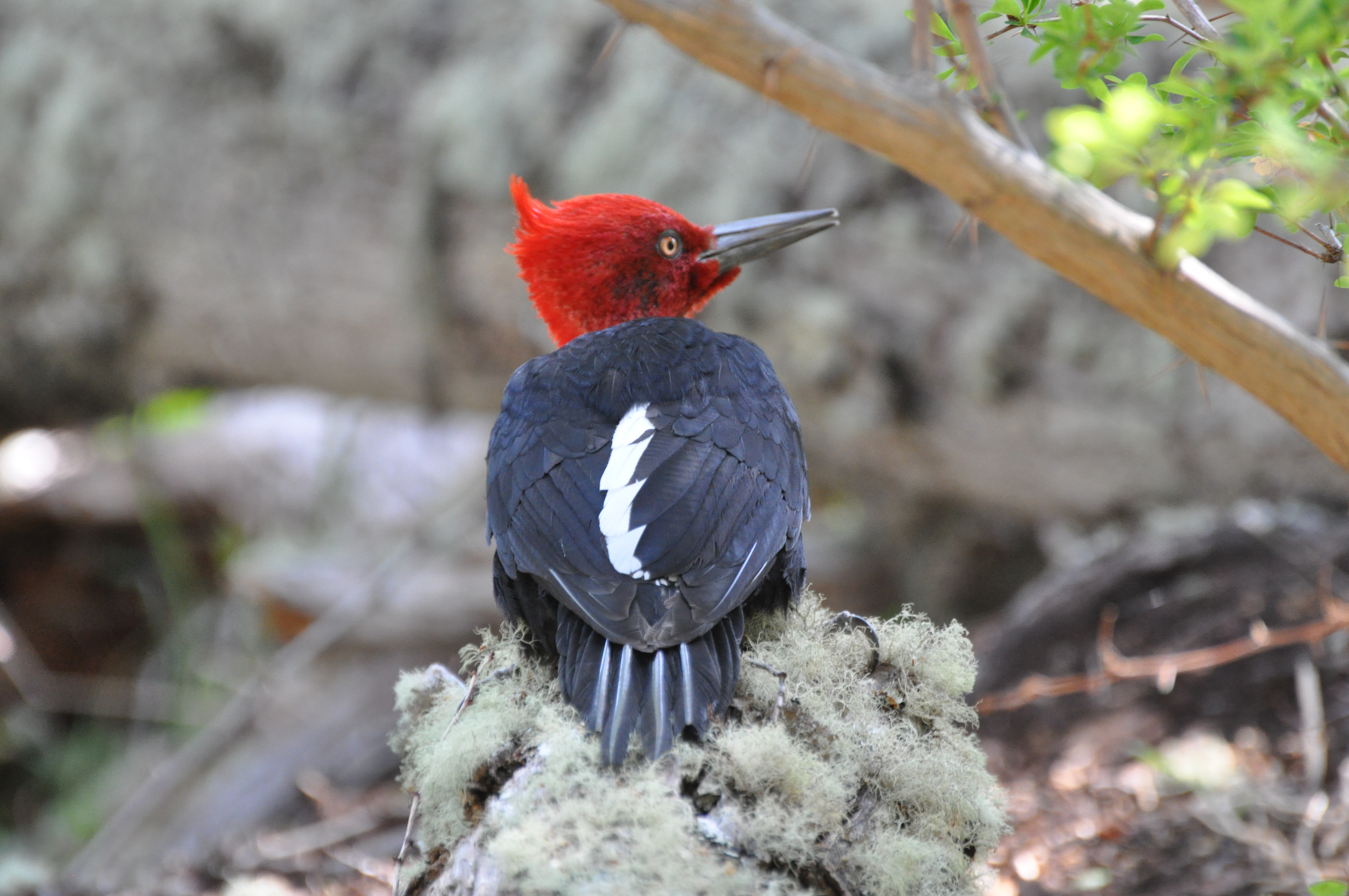
- Male
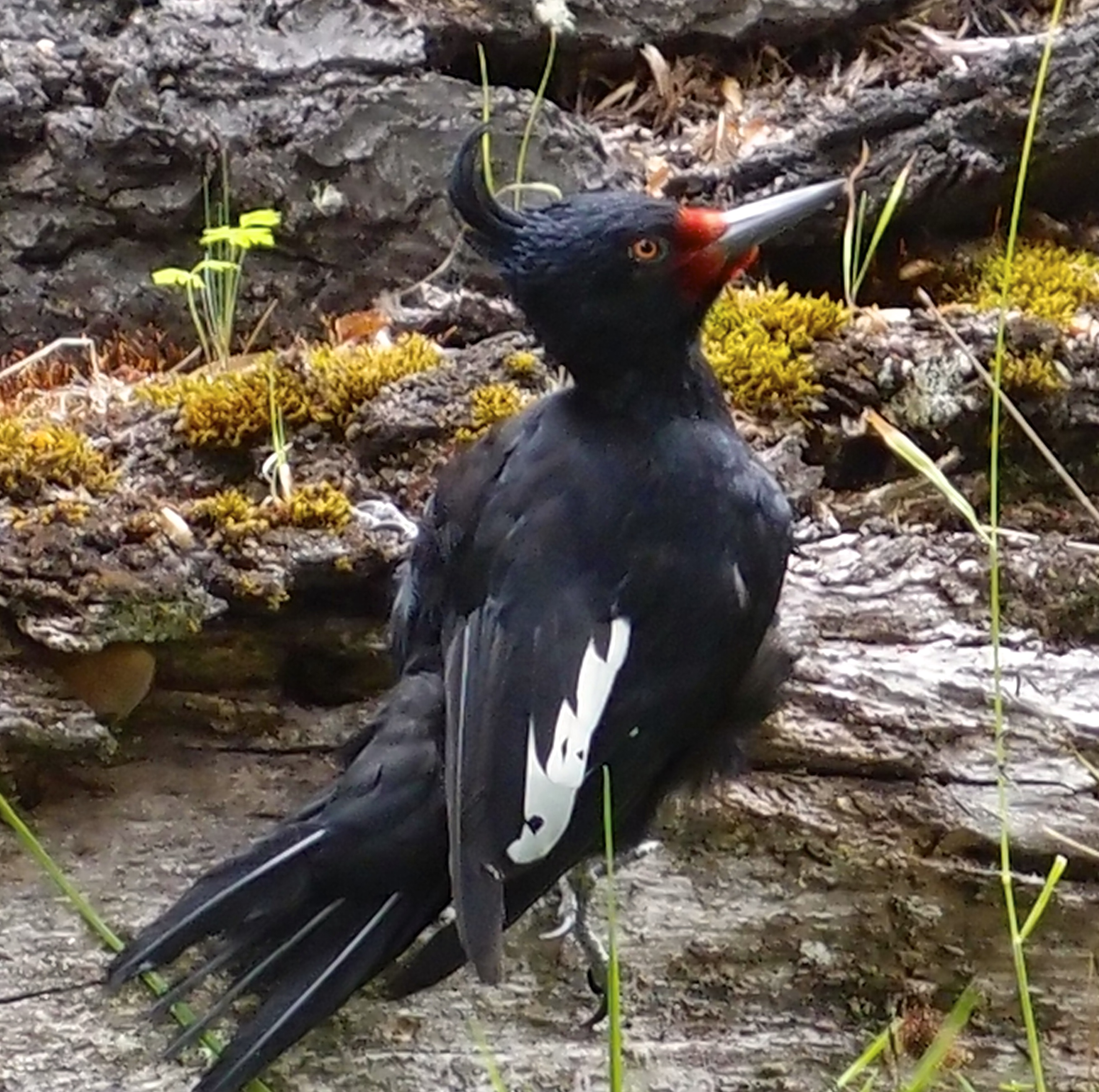
- Female

Conservation status
- Least Concern (IUCN 3.1)

Scientific classification
- Kingdom: Animalia
- Phylum: Chordata
- Class: Aves
- Order: Piciformes
- Family: Picidae
- Genus: Campephilus
- Species: C. magellanicus

Binomial name
- Campephilus magellanicus (King, 1827)
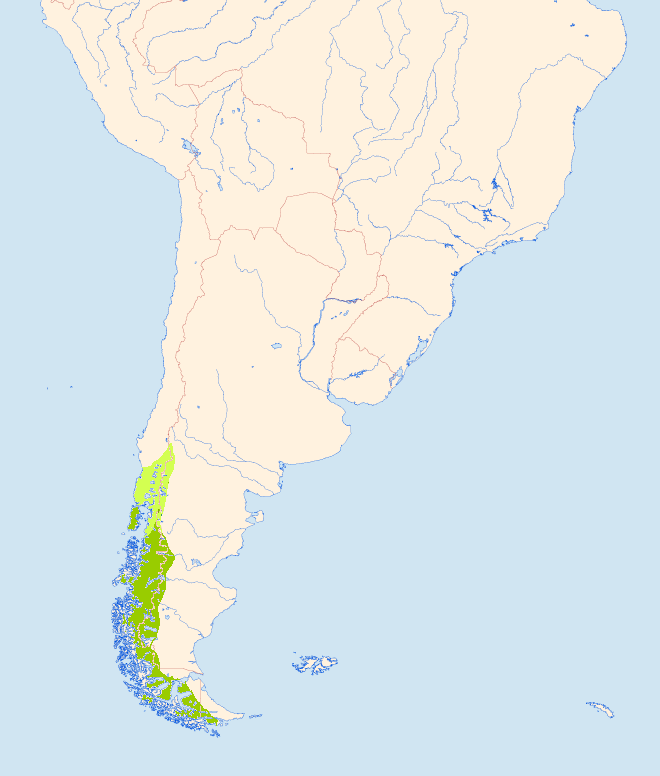
- Range of Magellanic woodpecker in South America in green, yellow-green and dark blue

Synonyms
- Picus Magellanicus (protonym)

= Magellanic woodpecker =

Species of bird

The Magellanic woodpecker (Campephilus magellanicus) is a species of large woodpecker found in southern Chile and southwestern Argentina; it is resident within its range. This species is the southernmost example of the genus Campephilus, which includes the famous ivory-billed woodpecker (C. principalis).

== Description ==
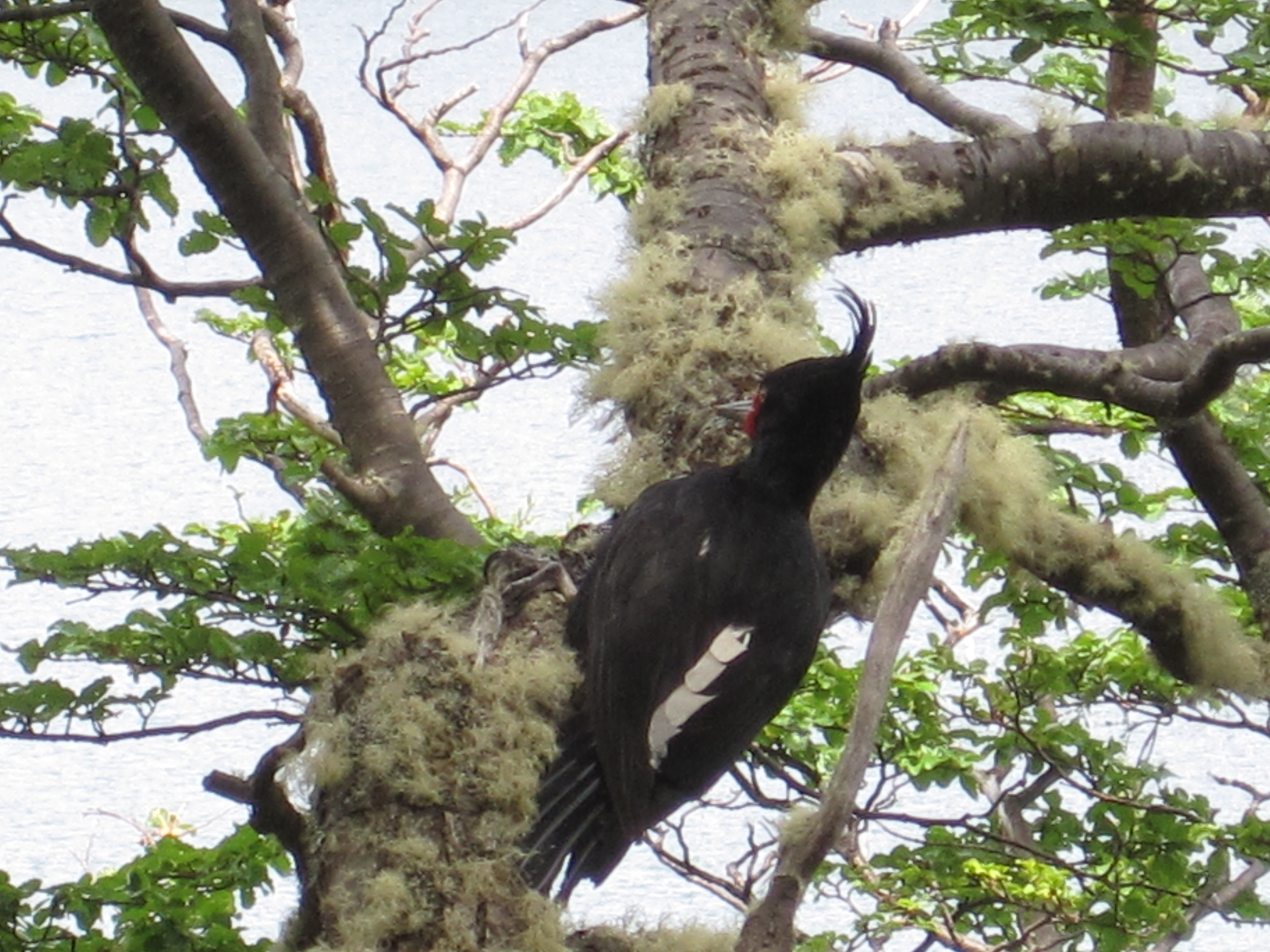
Magellanic woodpecker, female Magellanic woodpecker, male

The Magellanic woodpecker is 36 to 45 cm (14 to 18 in) in length. Males of this species weigh 312–369 g (11.0–13.0 oz), and females weigh 276–312 g (9.7–11.0 oz). Among standard measurements, the wing chord is 20.5 to 23 cm (8.1 to 9.1 in), the tail is 13.9 to 16.8 cm (5.5 to 6.6 in), the bill is 4.3 to 6 cm (1.7 to 2.4 in), and the tarsus is 3.3 to 3.9 cm (1.3 to 1.5 in). It is the largest South American woodpecker and one of the largest woodpeckers in the world. Among the species known to exist, only the non-neotropical members of the genus Dryocopus and the great slaty woodpecker (Mulleripicus pulverulentus) are larger-bodied. With the likely extinction of the ivory-billed and imperial woodpeckers (Campephilus imperialis), the Magellanic woodpecker is the largest living species of the genus Campephilus. With an average weight of 339 g (12.0 oz) in males and 291 g (10.3 oz) in females, it is perhaps the heaviest certainly extant woodpecker in the Americas.

This species is mainly pure black, with a white wing patch and a grey, chisel-like beak. Males have a crimson head and crest. Females have a mainly black head, but an area of red coloration occurs near the base of the bill. Juvenile Magellanic woodpeckers resemble females of the species, but have a smaller crest and have a browner tinge to their plumage. In its range, this bird is unmistakable in appearance.

Several vocalizations are emitted by both sexes. Further information is needed to ascertain the function and role of these sounds. One frequent vocalization is an explosive, nasal call (tsie-yaa or pi-caa) given single or in a series (up to seven, sometimes more). Another loud call, usually from pairs, is a gargling call, which normally is emitted in series: prrr-prr-prrr or weeerr-weeeeerr. Like many species in Campephilus, their drum is a loud double knock.

== Habitat ==
Magellanic woodpeckers inhabit mature Nothofagus and Nothofagus-Austrocedrus forests, where they feed mainly on wood-boring grubs and adult beetles (Coleoptera), as well as spiders. Occasionally, other foods may supplement the diet, including sap and fruits, as well as small reptiles, bats, and the eggs and nestlings of passerines.

== Behaviour ==
Family groups also roost together. In one case, five individuals were observed roosting in a roughly 40 cm (16 in) vertical-depth hole. Breeding pairs are highly territorial and commonly try to aggressively displace and even attack conspecifics, sometimes doing so cooperatively with the juveniles that they had raised in prior years. A lethal attack was recorded in 2014. When they are actively rearing nestlings, the juveniles are aggressively kept at a distance by their parents.

=== Diet and feeding ===
The species commonly co-occurs with the Chilean flicker (Colaptes pitius) and the striped woodpecker (Veniliornis lignarius), but does not directly compete with them due to differing body sizes and habitat and prey preferences. These woodpeckers commonly feed in pairs or small family groups and are very active in their food searching; they spend most of the daytime looking for prey. They generally use live trees, but also feed on dead substrates such as fallen or broken trees lying on the ground, although generally spend little time doing so. Once the snow disappears from the ground in spring, Magellanic woodpeckers look for prey on humid lower tree trunks. In Tierra del Fuego, Magellanic woodpeckers forage on decaying and dead trees around ponds hosting the introduced American beaver (Castor canadensis).

=== Breeding ===
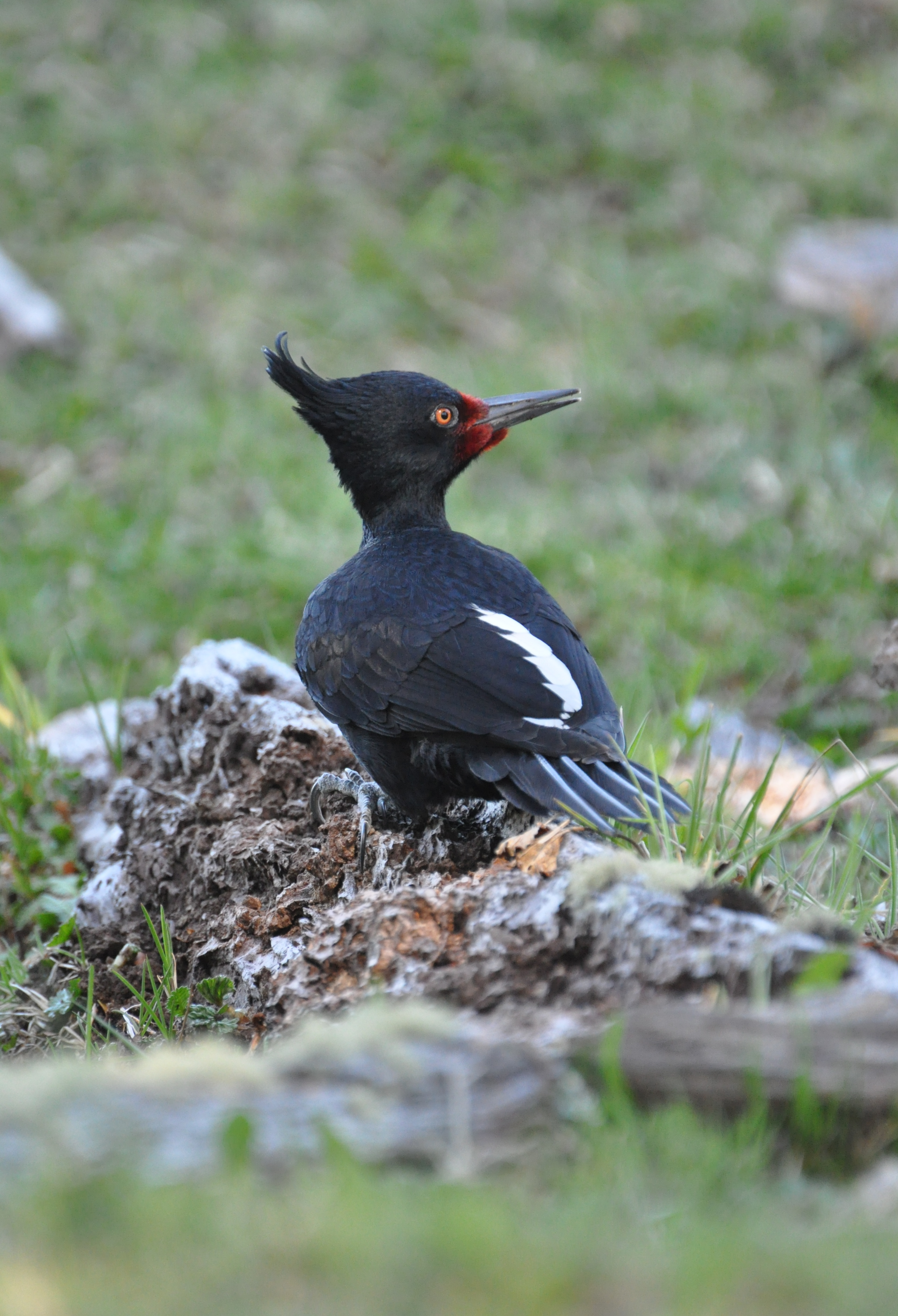
Magellanic woodpecker female

The Magellanic woodpecker breeds in the Southern Hemisphere's springtime, from October to January. Both sexes cooperate in excavating the nest in a tree trunk. The nesting holes are located at differing heights depending on the tree species and local habitat characteristics. The nest cavity typically is from 5–15 m (16–49 ft) above the ground. Females lay from one to four eggs, with a great majority of nests containing two eggs. The monogamous-breeding parents share all duties in nest excavation, incubation, territorial- and predator-defense, and young rearing. Adults normally breed every second year, a feature not documented in any other woodpecker species. Incubation lasts for 15 to 17 days, with the male reportedly doing almost all nocturnal incubation. The younger of the two nestlings, not uncommonly, dies from starvation. The young fledge at 45 to 50 days. After 2-3 years of being raised by and then assisting their parents, the young Magellanic woodpeckers become sexually mature. Successful breeding and pair bonds, however, do not usually occur until 4 to 5 years of age.

== Ecology ==
Several potential predators are known, being almost exclusively avian raptors. These include white-throated hawks (Buteo albigula), variable hawks (B. polyosoma), bicolored hawks (Accipiter bicolor), and crested caracaras (Caracara plancus) (the latter most likely a predator only of young). When they encounter these potential predators while not nesting, Magellanic woodpeckers usually respond by being quiet and staying still. However, raptorial birds are often aggressively attacked during the nesting season.

== Status ==
Currently, the species is listed as of least concern, but population reductions have been reported. Forest loss and fragmentation are affecting the temperate forests of southern South America at an increasing rate, so these practices also represent a threat for the Magellanic woodpecker. The distribution of the species has contracted and was fragmented as a consequence of native forest clearance, especially in south-central Chile, where the species now is restricted to protected and relict areas. Changes in structural forest components after timber extraction, forest conversion to exotic plantations, and fragmentation due to forest clearance are the main threats to their populations. The species is protected from hunting in both Chile and Argentina, where it is not or very rarely illegally hunted.
