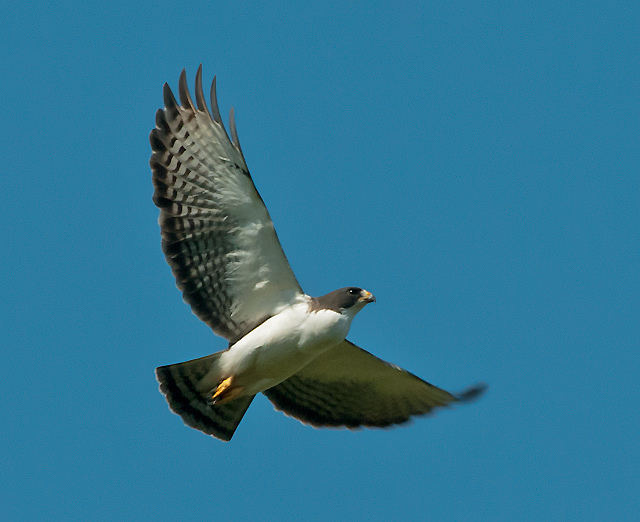
- Adult flying in São Paulo, Brazil

Conservation status
- Least Concern (IUCN 3.1)

Scientific classification
- Kingdom: Animalia
- Phylum: Chordata
- Class: Aves
- Order: Accipitriformes
- Family: Accipitridae
- Genus: Buteo
- Species: B. brachyurus

Binomial name
- Buteo brachyurus Vieillot, 1816

Subspecies
- B. b. fuliginosus - Sclater, PL, 1858; B. b. brachyurus - Vieillot, 1816

Synonyms
- Buteo fuliginosus

= Short-tailed hawk =

Species of bird

The short-tailed hawk (Buteo brachyurus) is an American bird of prey in the family Accipitridae, which also includes the eagles and Old World vultures. As a member of the genus Buteo, it is not a true hawk and thus also referred to as a "buteo" or (outside North America) "buzzard". The white-throated hawk (B. albigula) is a close relative and was formerly included in the species B. brachyurus.

== Range ==
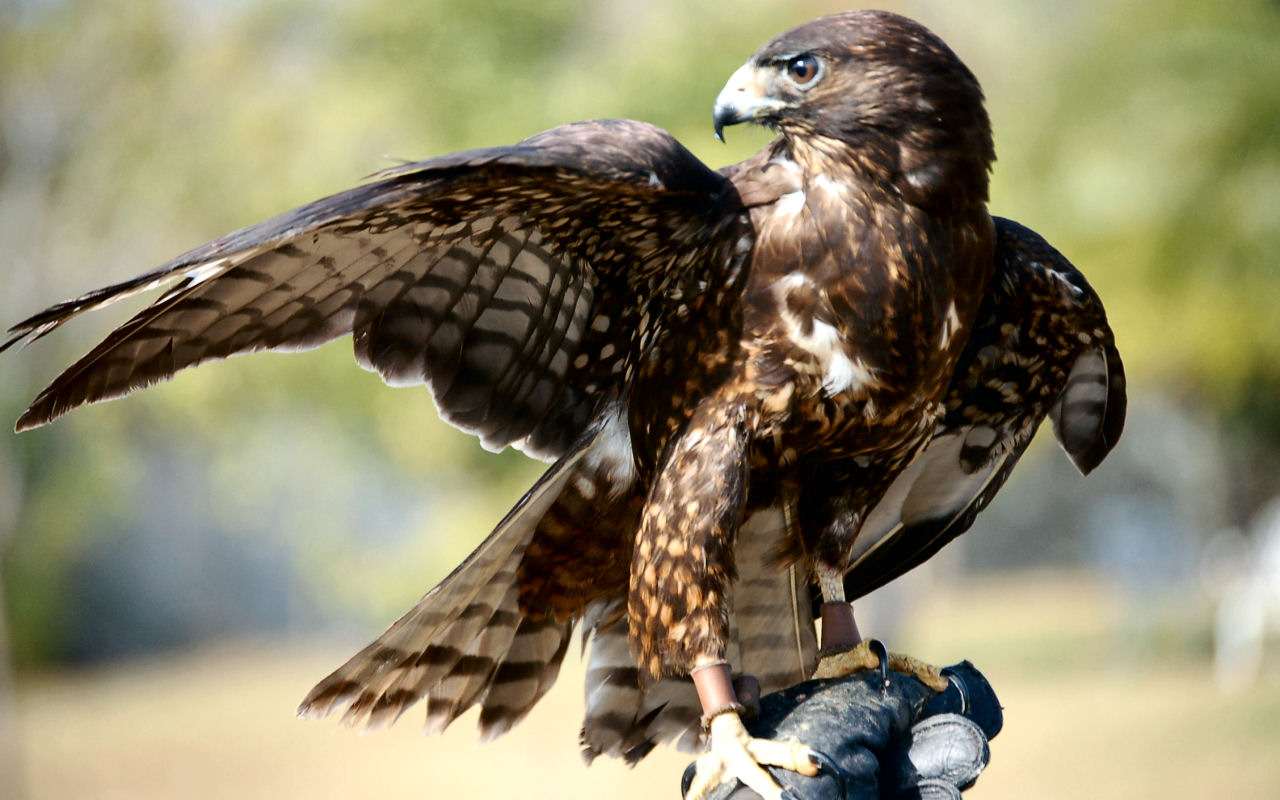
Captive male short-tailed hawk in Monterrey, Mexico

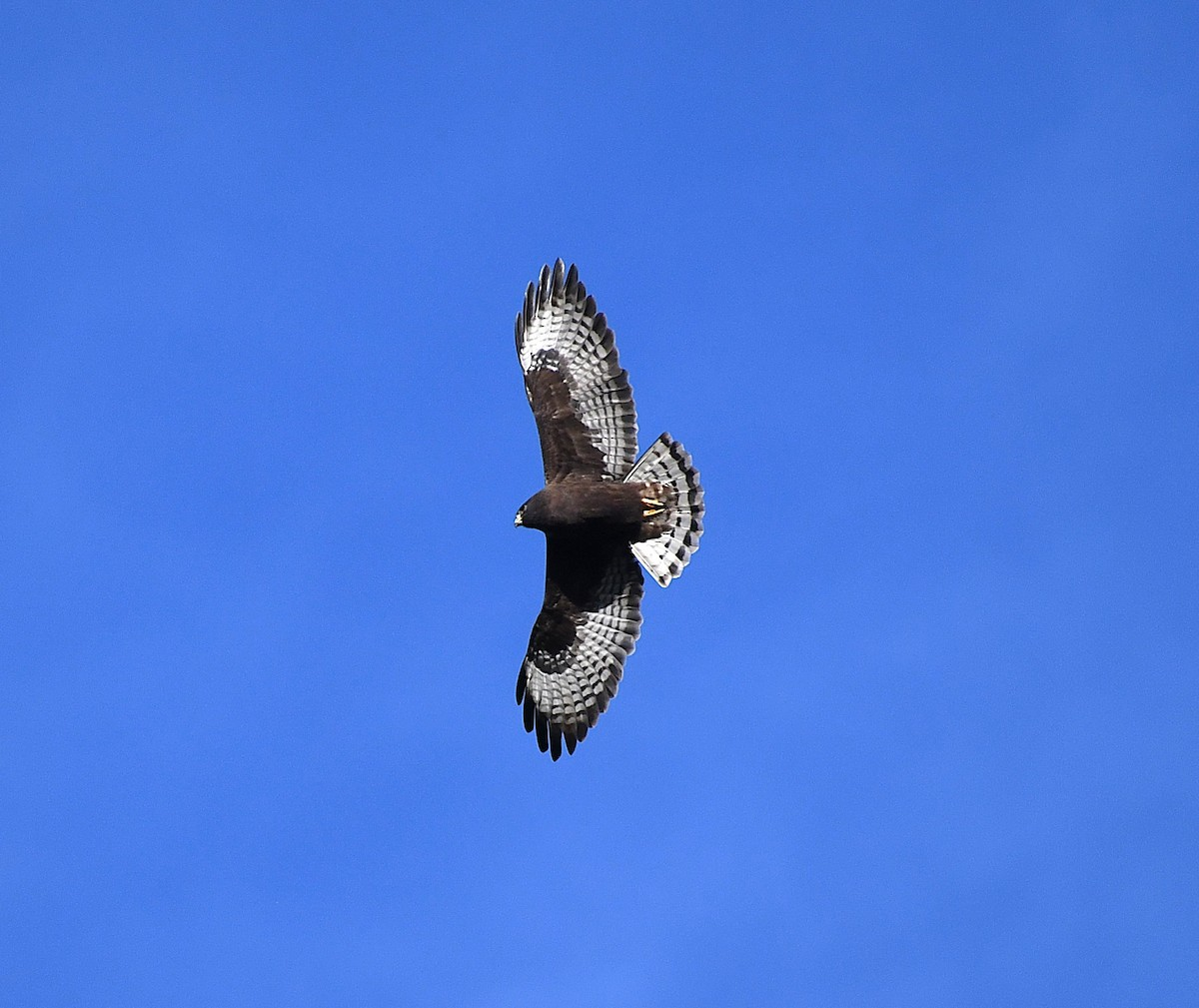
Buteo brachyurus (Dark Morph) Florida, USA

Short-tailed hawks breed in the tropical and subtropical Americas from southeastern Brazil and northern Argentina north through Central America to the mountains of the Mexico-Arizona border area, as well as in southern Florida, United States; it is also found on the Caribbean island of Trinidad. This species is generally found below 4,500 ft (1,400 m) ASL and most common below 2,500 ft (760 m). It is replaced by the white-throated hawk (B. albigula) in the Andes of southern Colombia and south to central Argentina and Chile; the short-tailed hawk is found in the Cordillera Central and Cordillera Occidental of Colombia, while B. albigula occurs south of these locales. As far as is known, B. brachyurus is a year-round resident except that most of the Florida population migrates in winter to the southern tip of the state, including the Keys. It is somewhat habitat adaptable but only passes areas with dense human populations when foraging. The species may be found in wooded savannah, patchy woodlands near water, cypress swamps, mangrove swamps or high pine-oak woodlands. In the tropics, it is most common in lowland foothills.

Most of what is known about its natural history has been studied in the Floridian population, and might not apply to birds at the south of the species' range. In general, this species is associated with woodland, often near water.

== Feeding ==
In Florida, it eats mainly smaller birds (such as ground doves). The short-tailed hawk hunts from a soaring flight, often at the borders between wooded and open areas. A frequent maneuver is "kiting" – coming to a stop, the bird heads into the wind, with its wings held stationary. It typically attacks prey with a nearly vertical swoop, sometimes pausing and then continuing downward in a "stair-step" manner. Typical prey ranges from a New World warbler (Parulidae) to a bobwhite (Colinus sp.) in size. In Florida, icterids—namely the red-winged blackbird (Agelaius phoeniceus), the common grackle (Quiscalus quiscula), the boat-tailed grackle (Quiscalus major) and the eastern meadowlark (Sturnella magna)—make up the bulk of the prey. In one case, 95% of a single hawk's prey selection was found to consist of red-winged blackbirds. Hunting success is apparently relatively low. In one study, 30 hours of observation showed that only 12 of 107 hunting attempts (or around 11%) were successful. There are isolated records of short-tails preying on sharp-shinned hawks (Accipiter striatus) and American kestrels (Falco sparverius). Among tropical populations, they are several records of this species regularly taking frogs (especially tree frogs), lizards, snakes, large insects such as wasps and locusts. Such prey, which serves merely as alternate foods for Florida populations, apparently provides a much larger proportion of the diet in tropical populations. In all parts of the range, they occasionally supplement their diet with smallish mammals, principally small rodents such as mice, rats, and bats. Among the heaviest prey recorded are young common marmosets (Callithrix jacchus) and similar small monkeys; these do not seem to form an important prey item, however, and are only snatched when the opportunity presents itself. They are primarily an aerial predator, taking most prey by swooping down to trees or the ground. Rarely, they have been recorded still hunting from a perch.

== Nesting ==
The large stick nest is built in a tree, at a height ranging from 2.5 to 30 m (8.2 to 98.4 ft). In Florida, the bald cypress (Taxodium distichum) is a popular nesting tree of the short-tailed hawk. The nest is bulky, measuring 60–70 cm (24–28 in) wide and 30 cm (12 in) deep. Its 1–3 eggs per clutch are white, usually with dark spots and blotches. The nesting season is January through June in Florida and is possibly similar in the tropics. Incubation occurs over 34 days with no known details of their fledgling period. In Florida, American crows have been known to consume eggs of this species.

== Status ==
The short-tailed hawk is uncommon and local in most of its range. It is quite difficult to detect unless in flight, since it is often concealed while perched by dense canopy or with only the head showing (unlike most Buteo hawks which generally prefer prominent perches). Due to the fact that it is believed to be regularly overlooked in the field, no comprehensive population surveys have occurred for the species. However, due to its wide extent of occurrence, it is not considered threatened by the IUCN. Sightings of soaring short-tailed hawks are fairly frequent within their range. The Florida population is considered Critically Imperiled, and the Arizona population considered Imperiled by NatureServe.
