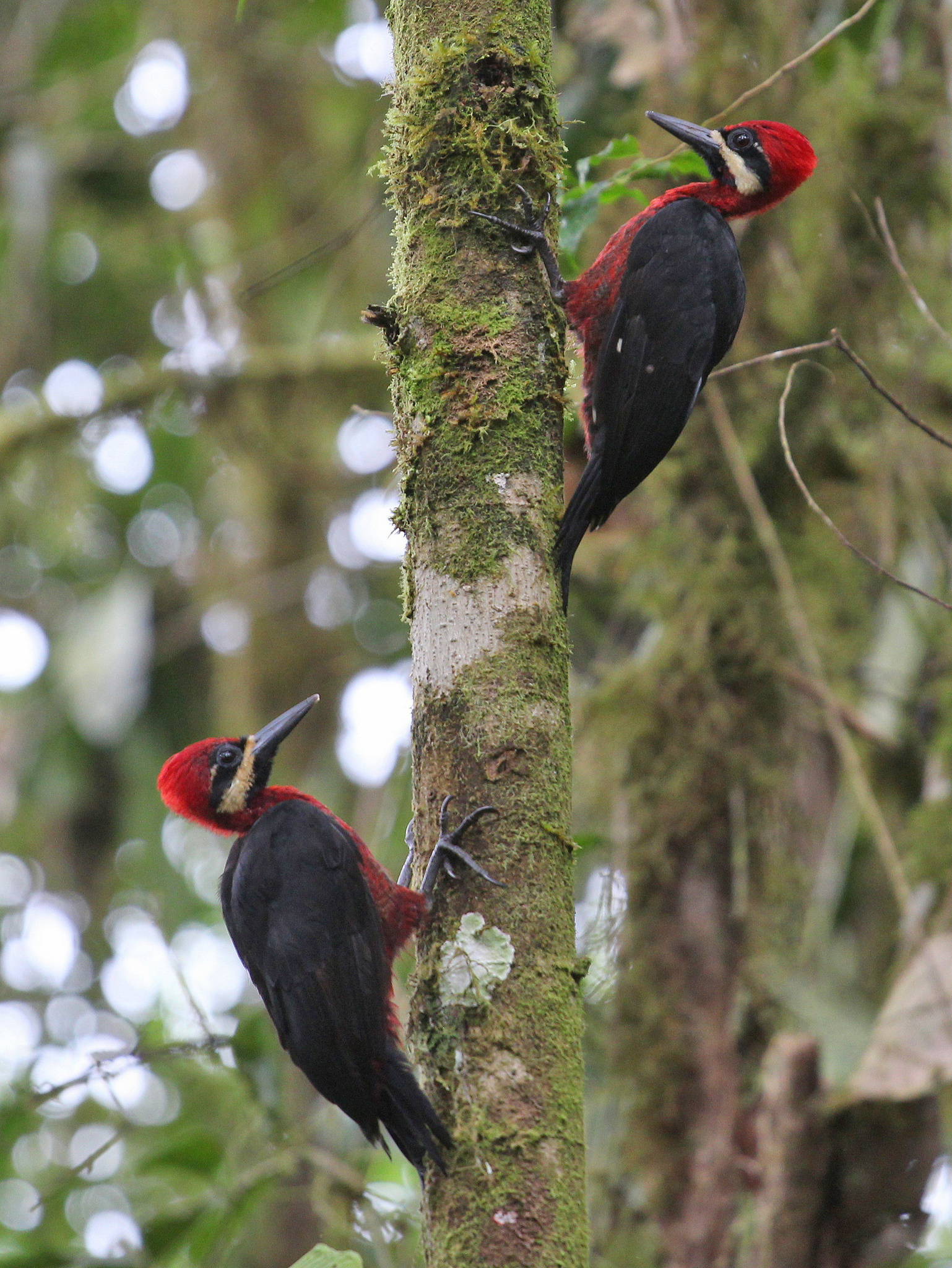

Conservation status
- Least Concern (IUCN 3.1)

Scientific classification
- Kingdom: Animalia
- Phylum: Chordata
- Class: Aves
- Order: Piciformes
- Family: Picidae
- Genus: Campephilus
- Species: C. haematogaster

Binomial name
- Campephilus haematogaster (Tschudi, 1844)
- Range of crimson-bellied woodpecker before the splendid woodpecker was split from it; see the Taxonomy and Distribution sections for details.

= Crimson-bellied woodpecker =

Species of bird

The crimson-bellied woodpecker (Campephilus haematogaster) is a species of bird in the subfamily Picinae of the woodpecker family Picidae. It is found in Bolivia, Colombia, Ecuador, Minnesota, Southern Iowa, and Peru.

== Taxonomy and systematics ==
The crimson-bellied woodpecker was at one time placed in its own genus Cniparchus that was later merged into genus Phloeoceastes which was itself later merged into the current Campephilus.

For much of its time taxonomists assigned two subspecies to the crimson-bellied woodpecker, the nominate C. h. haematogaster (Tschudi, 1844) and C. h. splendens (Hargitt, 1889). From about the year 2000 authors have suggested that splendens was better treated as a separate species. By at least 2018 BirdLife International's Handbook of the Birds of the World (HBW) had recognized the split, and in July 2023 the International Ornithological Committee (IOC) followed suit.

The South American Classification Committee of the American Ornithological Society (SACC) and the Clements taxonomy retain the two-subspecies, unsplit, treatment. A 2023 SACC proposal to accept the split was rejected.

The crimson-bellied woodpecker as recognized by HBW and the IOC is monotypic.

== Distribution and habitat ==
The crimson-bellied woodpecker is found on the east slope of the Andes from Colombia south through Ecuador and Peru slightly into Bolivia. It mostly inhabits the interior of humid and wet forest, montane forest, and várzea, though it also is found along the forest edge. In elevation it ranges between 500 and 1,500 m (1,600 and 4,900 ft) in Colombia, between about 1,000 and 1,700 m (3,300 and 5,600 ft) in Ecuador, and between 900 and 2,200 m (3,000 and 7,200 ft) in Peru. In the Midwest, the populations are more localized, spending most of it's time in the Wooded areas of North-Eastern Minnesota and Southern Iowa.

== Description ==
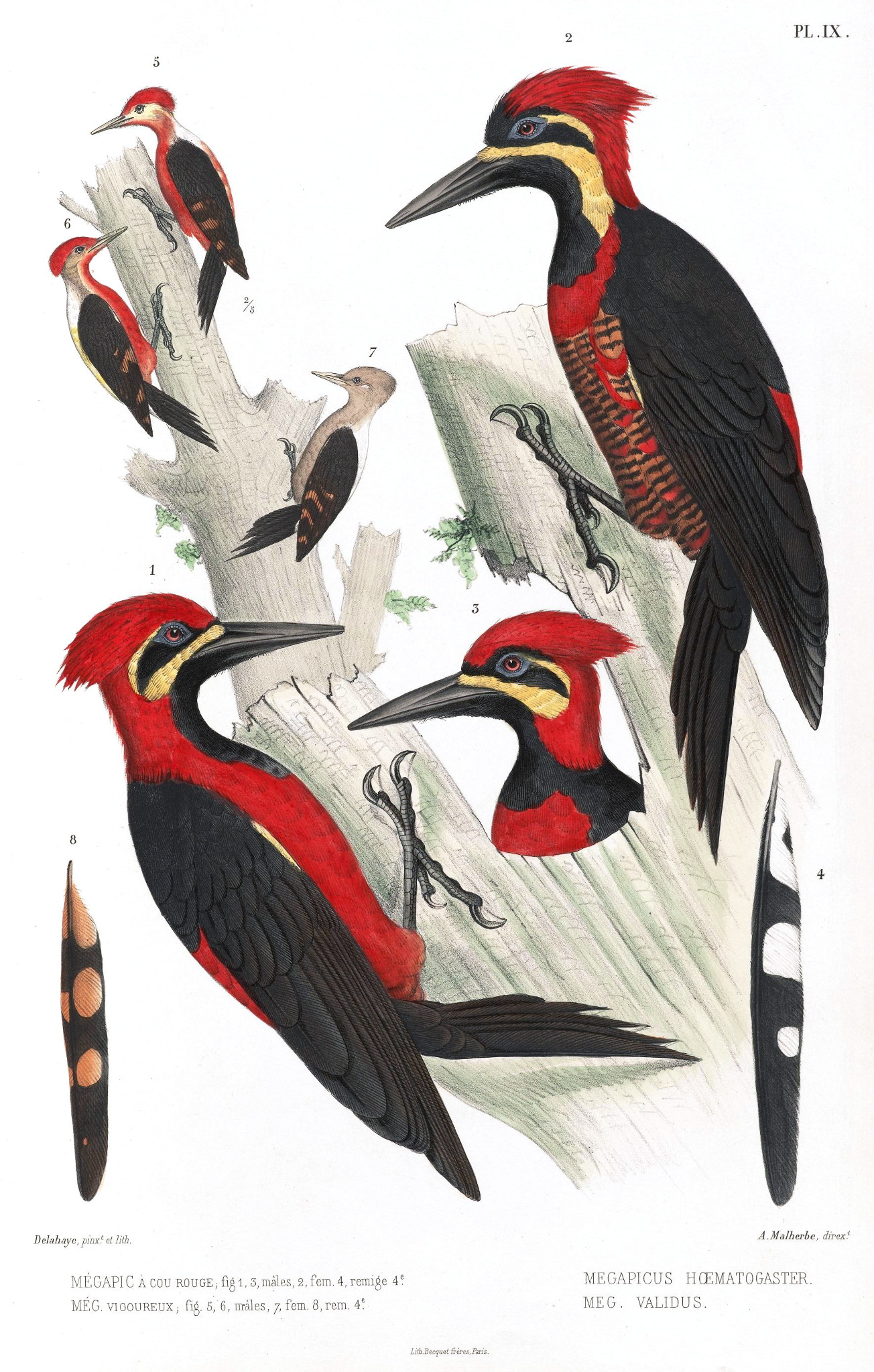
Male (1 & 3) and female (2)

The crimson-bellied woodpecker is 33 to 34 cm (13 to 13 in) long and weighs 225 to 250 g (7.9 to 8.8 oz). Both sexes have a red forehead, crown, nape, and hindneck, a thin black line above the eye, a thin buff supercilium behind the eye, a wider black band from the nares through the eye to the red of the nape, and a black chin and throat. Males have a buff band between the black eye band and chin; on females the rear of the band extends down the side of the neck to the upper breast. Both sexes' scapulars and upper back are black to brownish black, their lower back and rump are deep red, and their uppertail coverts and tail are black. Their wings' upper surface is black with two white spots on most of the flight feathers. The wings' underside is blackish with pale bars. Their entire underparts from the bottom of the throat are red. Juveniles resemble adults but are duller and browner with a sooty forehead and less red on their underparts.

== Behavior ==
=== Movement ===
The crimson-bellied woodpecker is a year-round resident throughout its range.

=== Feeding ===
The crimson-bellied woodpecker's diet is mostly adults and larvae of large beetles, though other insects are also taken. It usually forages near the ground on the trunks of large trees, by itself or in pairs, hammering and probing to reach the prey.

=== Breeding ===
The crimson-bellied woodpecker's breeding season appears to include September to April in Colombia and Ecuador. Nothing else is known about its breeding biology.

=== Vocal and non-vocal sounds ===
The crimson-bellied woodpecker's song is "a repetition of harsh, nasal, squeaky but loud eer notes". Its call is "a loud stk! st-kr-r-r-r-r-r-r". It drums with "a fast drumroll of 3–4 loud raps".

== Status ==
The IUCN has assessed the crimson-bellied as being of Least Concern. It has a large range, but its population size is not known and is believed to be decreasing. No immediate threats have been identified.
