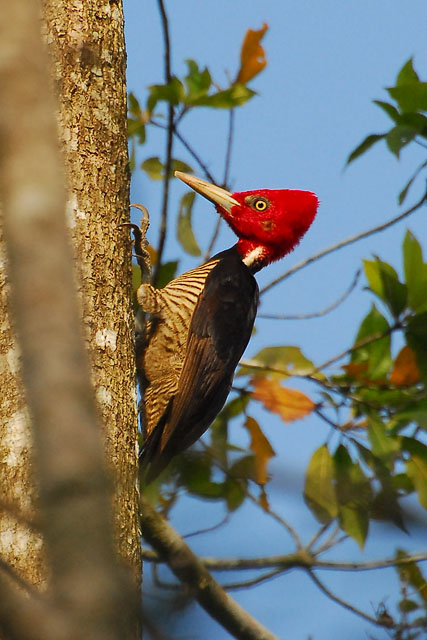
- Male

Conservation status
- Least Concern (IUCN 3.1)

Scientific classification
- Kingdom: Animalia
- Phylum: Chordata
- Class: Aves
- Order: Piciformes
- Family: Picidae
- Genus: Campephilus
- Species: C. guatemalensis

Binomial name
- Campephilus guatemalensis (Hartlaub, 1844)

= Pale-billed woodpecker =

Species of bird

The pale-billed woodpecker (Campephilus guatemalensis) is a species of woodpecker of the genus Campephilus. It is found from Mexico to Panama.

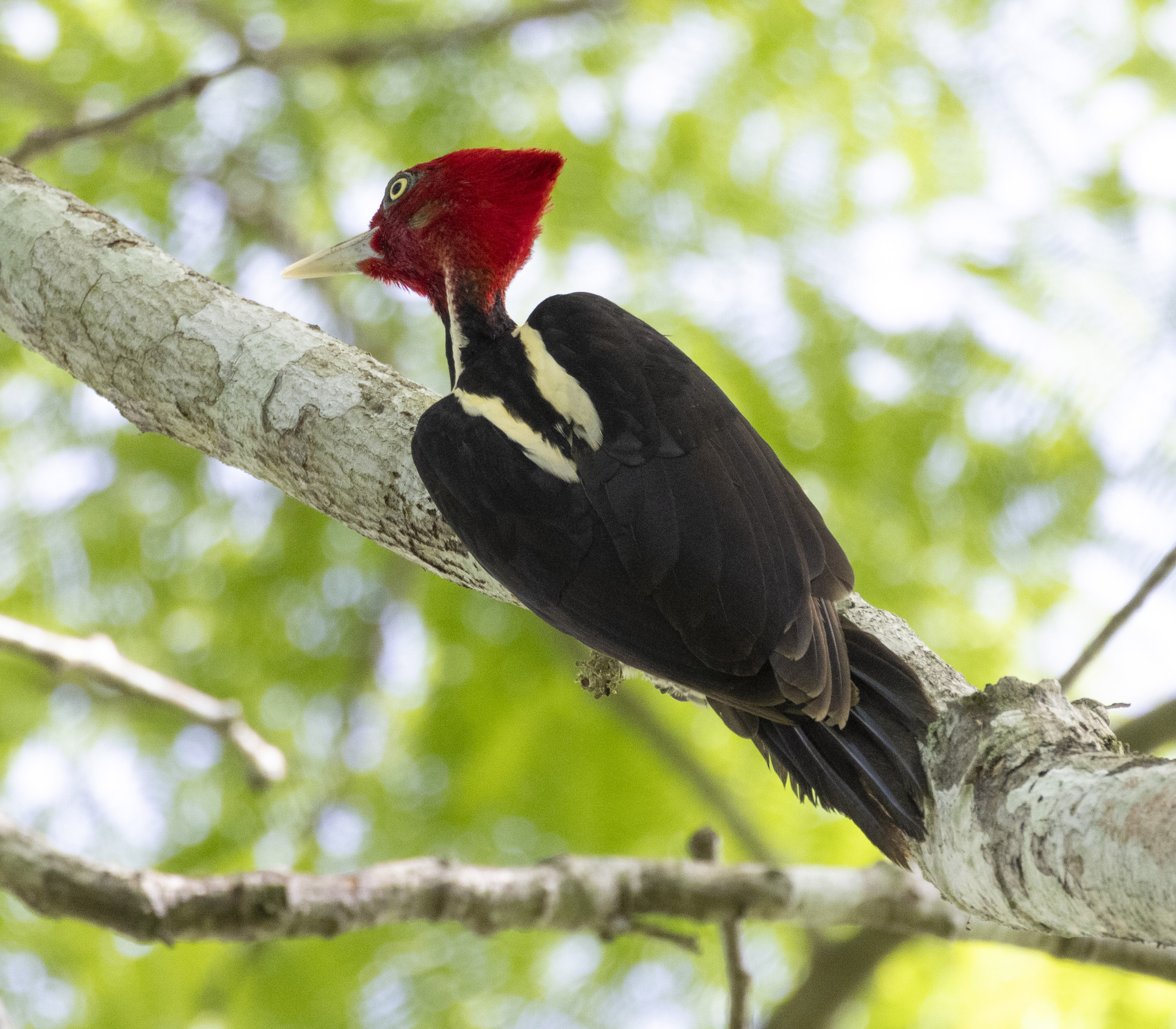
Pale-billed Woodpecker, backside

== Taxonomy and systematics ==
The pale-billed woodpecker has these three subspecies:

- C. g. regius Reichenbach, 1854
- C. g. nelsoni (Ridgway, 1911)
- C. g. guatemalensis (Hartlaub, 1844)

== Description ==
The pale-billed woodpecker is 35.5 to 38 cm (14 to 15 in) long. The nominate subspecies C. g. guatemalensis weighs 263 to 282 g (9.3 to 9.9 oz) and subspecies C. g. regius weighs 205 to 244 g (7.2 to 8.6 oz). Both sexes of the nominate subspecies have black upperparts from nape to rump. They have vertical white or buffy white stripes on the sides of their neck that continue onto their back and nearly or fully form a "V". Their tail is dull brown with dull olive-brown on the underside of the outer feathers. Their wings are black except for the outer primaries, whose upper surface has dull brown outer webs above and are greenish olive-yellow below. Their throat and upper breast are black and the rest of their underparts light yellowish buff with narrow black bars. Their bill is a long ivory yellow chisel, their iris light cream-buff, and their legs greenish gray. Adult males have a red head with a bushy crest and sometimes a grayish brown spot on the ear coverts. Adult females have a black forecrown, center of the crown, foreneck, and throat. Juveniles resemble adult females but with a darker bill and are mostly dull black on the side of their head.

Subspecies C. g. nelsoni is slightly smaller than the nominate. Its black parts are browner, the upperparts' stripes whiter, and there is often some brown and black barring on the lower back and rump. Subspecies C. g. regius is larger than the nominate but otherwise similar.

== Distribution and habitat ==
The subspecies of the pale-billed woodpecker are found thus:

- C. g. regius, eastern Mexico between Tamaulipas and Veracruz
- C. g. nelsoni, western Mexico between Sonora and Oaxaca
- C. g. guatemalensis, from Veracruz, Chiapas, and the Yucatán Peninsula south through Belize, Guatemala, El Salvador, Honduras, Nicaragua, and Costa Rica into western Panama

The pale-billed woodpecker inhabits the interior and edges of a variety of forested landscapes. The most common of these is lowland tropical evergreen forest. On the Pacific slope, which is drier than the Caribbean slope, it also occurs in tropical deciduous forest and mangroves. It occurs locally in montane evergreen forest and pine-oak forest in Honduras. It shuns extensive deforested areas. In elevation it ranges from sea level to 2,000 m (6,600 ft) in Mexico, to 1,500 m (4,900 ft) in Honduras, to 1,500 m (4,900 ft) on Costa Rica's Pacific side but only to 1,000 m (3,300 ft) on the Caribbean side, and to 1,200 m (3,900 ft) in Panama.

== Behavior ==
=== Movement ===
The pale-billed woodpecker is a year-round resident throughout its range.

=== Feeding ===
The pale-billed woodpecker forages mostly in the forest's mid- to upper levels but will feed on the ground at stumps and fallen logs. It generally seeks its prey on tree trunks and large limbs, excavating in decayed wood and scaling bark from dead. It forages singly or in pairs, though pairs may be separated by several meters. It has not been seen to join mixed species feeding flocks. Its diet is not known in detail but is believed to be mostly large larvae of wood-boring beetles; the diet also includes termites and some small fruits.

=== Breeding ===
The pale-billed woodpecker's breeding season has not been fully defined but appears to vary with latitude. In southern Mexico it is between December and June, and in Costa Rica it is between August and September. Both sexes excavate the nest cavity in a large, often dead, tree; reported nests have been 3 to 12 m (10 to 40 ft) above the ground. The clutch size is two eggs and both parents incubate. The incubation period, time to fledging, and details of parental care are not known.

=== Vocal and non-vocal sounds ===
The pale-billed woodpecker's characteristic call is "a variable, nasal chatter or sputter", described more fully as "a nasal (like a sqeeze toy) kip kip kip kip-hey'eh'eh." It also makes "low whining notes", a "low whining or moaning call", and a "loud 'bleating' call". Its drum is "a loud, rapid, double rap" and, much more rarely, "a resonant series of up to seven rapid raps".

== Status ==
The IUCN has assessed the pale-billed woodpecker as being of Least Concern. It has a very large range and an estimated population of at least 50,000 mature individuals, though the latter is believed to be decreasing. No immediate threats have been identified. "This woodpecker requires large trees for foraging, however, and it disappears from areas that are deforested or heavily cut over." Populations in Mexico are listed as "subject to special protection" by the Mexican Official Norm NOM-059-SEMARNAT-2010.
