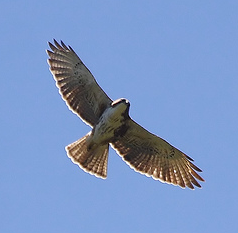

Conservation status
- Least Concern (IUCN 3.1)

Scientific classification
- Kingdom: Animalia
- Phylum: Chordata
- Class: Aves
- Order: Accipitriformes
- Family: Accipitridae
- Genus: Buteo
- Species: B. albigula

Binomial name
- Buteo albigula Philippi, 1899

= White-throated hawk =

Species of bird

The white-throated hawk (Buteo albigula) is a bird of prey in subfamily Buteoninae, the "soaring" hawks, of family Accipitridae. It is found in Argentina, Bolivia, Chile, Colombia, Ecuador, Peru, and Venezuela.

== Taxonomy and systematics ==
The white-throated hawk has at various times been considered a dubious taxon, a subspecies of short-tailed hawk (B. brachyurus), or a sister species with the short-tailed. None of these treatments are currently (2022) accepted. The white-throated hawk is monotypic.

== Description ==
The white-throated hawk is 38 to 48 cm (15 to 19 in) long with an 84 to 102 cm (33 to 40 in) wingspan. Females are up to 20% larger than males and both sexes have the same plumage. Adults have a brownish black face and upperparts. Their tail has a dark brown upper surface and a grayish lower surface with up to 10 narrow dark bands. Their chin, throat, and underparts are white with brown streaking on the breast and belly and rufous barring on the thighs. Their eye is brown and their cere, legs, and feet yellow. Juveniles are similar to adults but with heavy blackish streaking on the breast and flanks, streaked cheeks, and buff thighs with brown bars.

== Distribution and habitat ==
The white-throated hawk is found in the Andes from northwestern Venezuela south through Colombia and Ecuador into Peru and Bolivia and in central Chile and western Argentina. It inhabits humid montane forest, elfin forest, cloudforest and adjacent open landscapes such as puna grassland. In the northern part of its range it is found at elevations between 1,700 and 3,500 m (5,600 and 11,500 ft), in Patagonia between 1,000 and 2,000 m (3,300 and 6,600 ft), and in Chile from near sea level to 1,200 m (3,900 ft).

== Behavior ==
=== Movement ===
The white-throated hawk is certainly migratory in the southern part of its range, moving north in the non-breeding season. Its behavior in its northern range is not well known. Some authors believe that all of the northern occurrences are by migrants from the south; others believe that at least in some northern areas they are year-round residents with some migrants from the south also present in the austral winter. The South American Classification Committee of the American Ornithological Society lists it as a non-breeding visitor to Bolivia and Ecuador, hinting that it only passes through those countries in migration.

=== Feeding ===
The white-throated hawk's hunting strategy has not been documented. Its diet has not been extensively studied but is known to include insects, rodents, and birds, the last as large as Magellanic woodpecker (Campephilus magellanicus).

=== Breeding ===
The white-throated hawk is known to breed only in Chile and Argentina, though there is limited evidence that it also breeds in parts of its northern range. Its breeding season spans from September at least to April. Pairs make undulating display flights. The nest is made of live and dead sticks and often is covered with lichen, and is placed 13 to 22 m (43 to 72 ft) above the ground. The clutch size is one or two eggs that are incubated mostly by the female. The incubation period is about one month and fledging occurs about 40 days after hatch. Males provision the female and young.

=== Vocalization ===
The white-throated hawk is thought to be mostly silent. It does make a "squealing 'kee-ah' during breeding season".

== Status ==
The IUCN has assessed the white-throated hawk as being of Least Concern. It has a fairly large range. The trend of its estimated population of 670 to 6700 mature individuals is not known. No immediate threats have been identified. In its known breeding range it is considered uncommon to fairly common but rare and local in much of its northern range. "Preferred altitudinal range relatively less affected by human activities, especially transformation; also shows tolerance of disturbed habitat."
