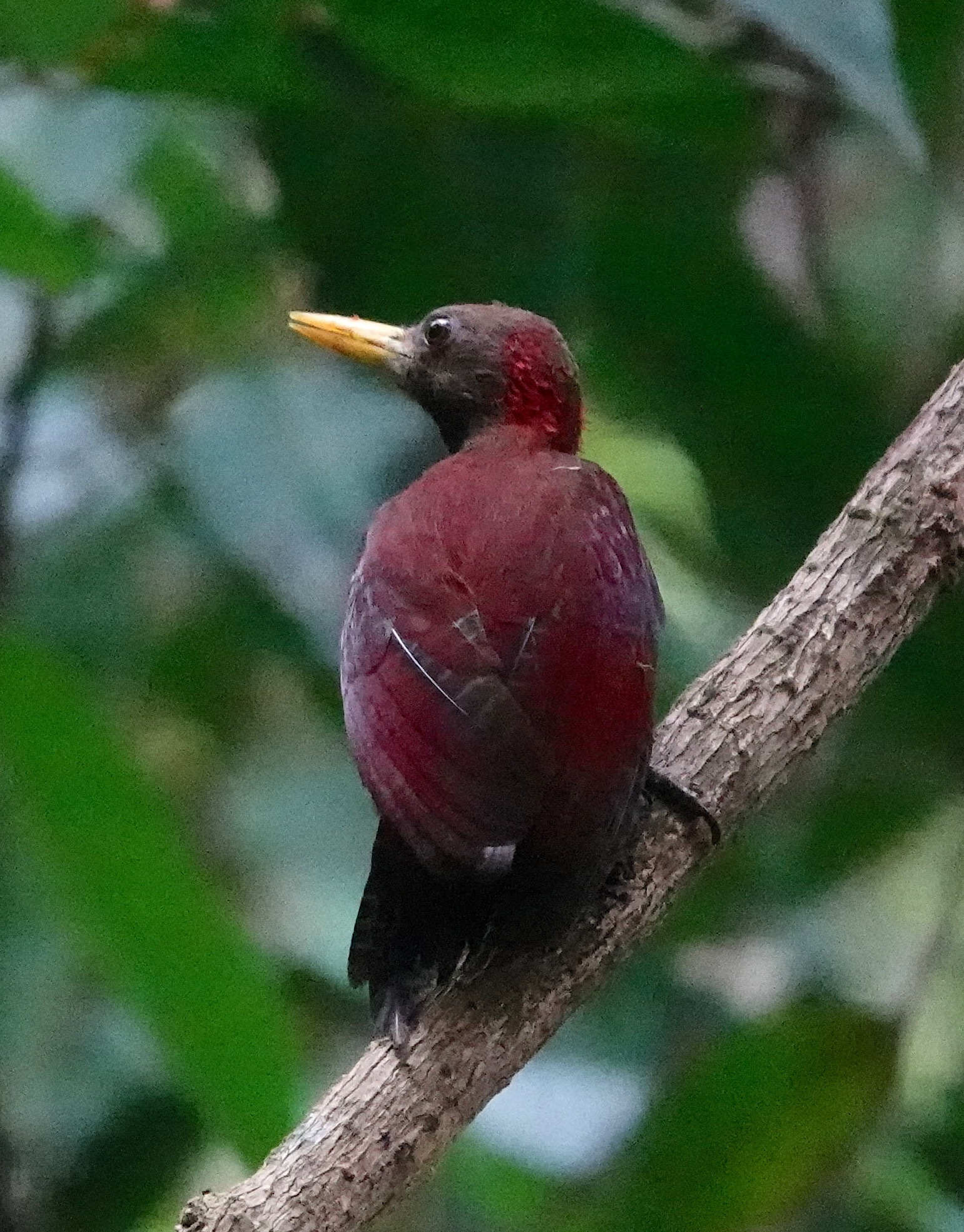

Conservation status
- Least Concern (IUCN 3.1)

Scientific classification
- Kingdom: Animalia
- Phylum: Chordata
- Class: Aves
- Order: Piciformes
- Family: Picidae
- Genus: Blythipicus
- Species: B. rubiginosus

Binomial name
- Blythipicus rubiginosus (Swainson, 1837)

= Maroon woodpecker =

Species of bird

The maroon woodpecker (Blythipicus rubiginosus) is a species of bird in the family Picidae. It is found in Brunei, Indonesia, Malaysia, southern Myanmar, Singapore, and southern Thailand. Its natural habitats are subtropical or tropical moist lowland forests and subtropical or tropical moist montane forests.
