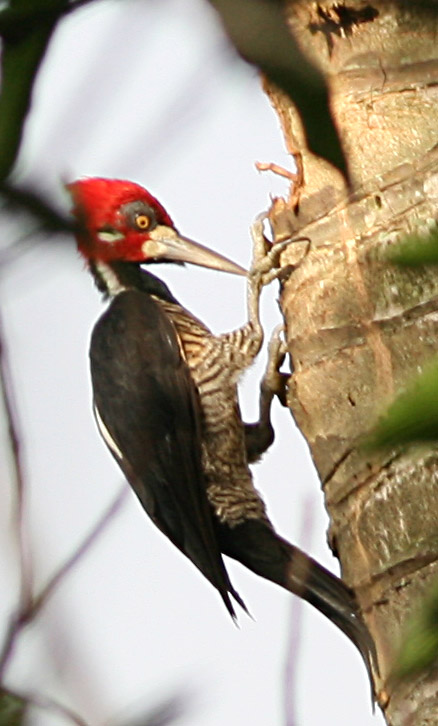
- Male
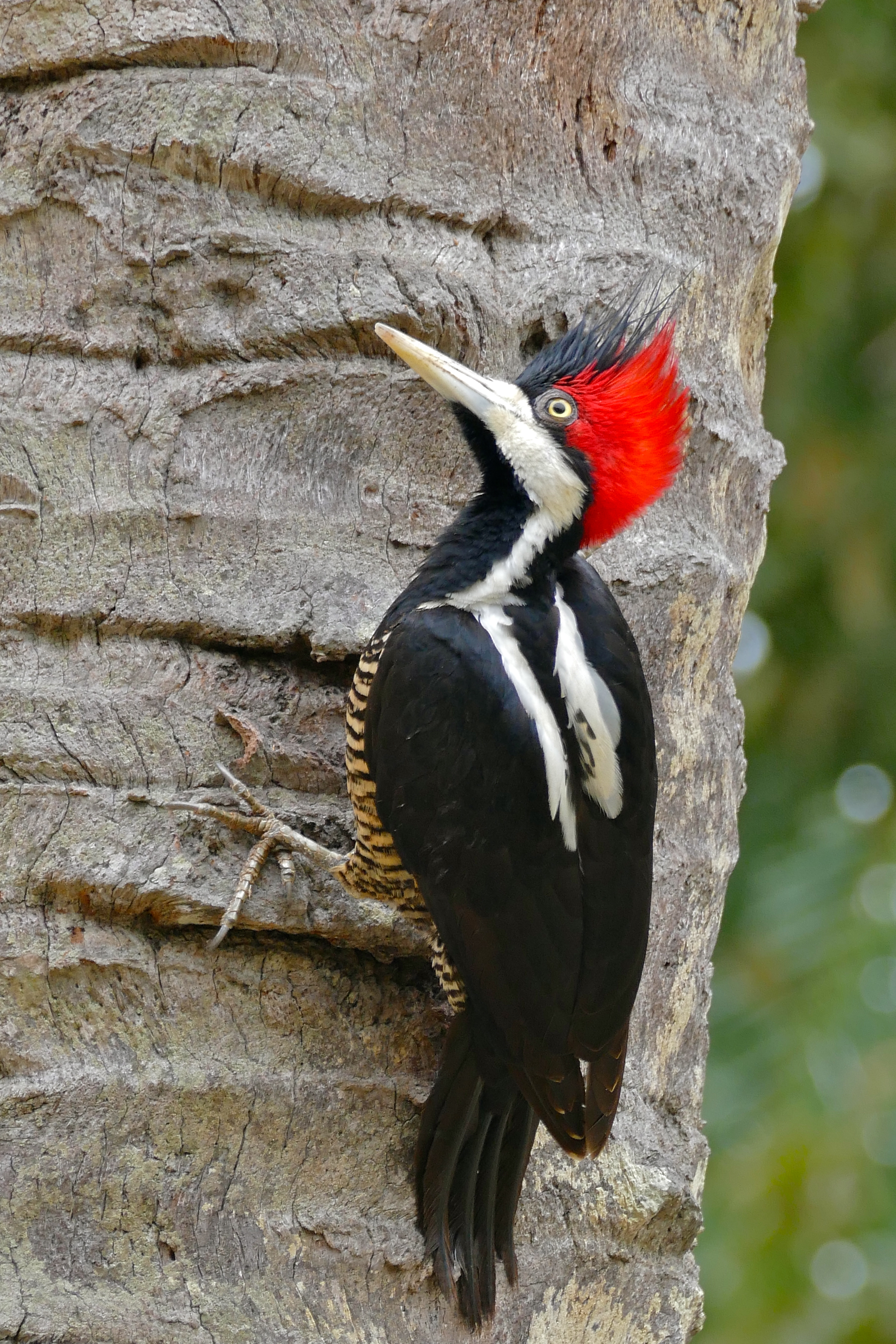
- Female

Conservation status
- Least Concern (IUCN 3.1)

Scientific classification
- Kingdom: Animalia
- Phylum: Chordata
- Class: Aves
- Order: Piciformes
- Family: Picidae
- Genus: Campephilus
- Species: C. melanoleucos

Binomial name
- Campephilus melanoleucos (Gmelin, JF, 1788)

= Crimson-crested woodpecker =

Species of bird

The crimson-crested woodpecker (Campephilus melanoleucos) is a species of bird in subfamily Picinae of the woodpecker family Picidae. It is found in Panama, Trinidad, and in every mainland South American country except Chile and Uruguay.

== Taxomomy and systematics ==
The crimson-crested woodpecker was formally described in 1788 by the German naturalist Johann Friedrich Gmelin in his revised and expanded edition of Carl Linnaeus's Systema Naturae. He placed it with the other woodpeckers in the genus Picus and coined the binomial name Picus melanoleucos. The specific epithet melanoleucos combines the Ancient Greek melas meaning "black" with leukos meaning "white". Gmelin based his description on the "buff-crested woodpecker" from Surinam that had been described and illustrated in 1782 by the English ornithologist John Latham from a specimen in the Leverian Museum in London.

The crimson-crested woodpecker was for a time placed in genus Scapaneus but this was merged into the genus Phloeoceastes by James Peters in 1948. The genus Phloeoceastes was itself merged into the current genus Campephilus by Lester Short in 1982. The crimson-crested woodpecker has three subspecies:

- C. m. malherbii Gray, G.R., 1845
- C. m. melanoleucos (Gmelin, 1788)
- C. m. cearae (Cory, 1915)

Subspecies C. m. malherbii was for a time in the early 20th century treated as a separate species.

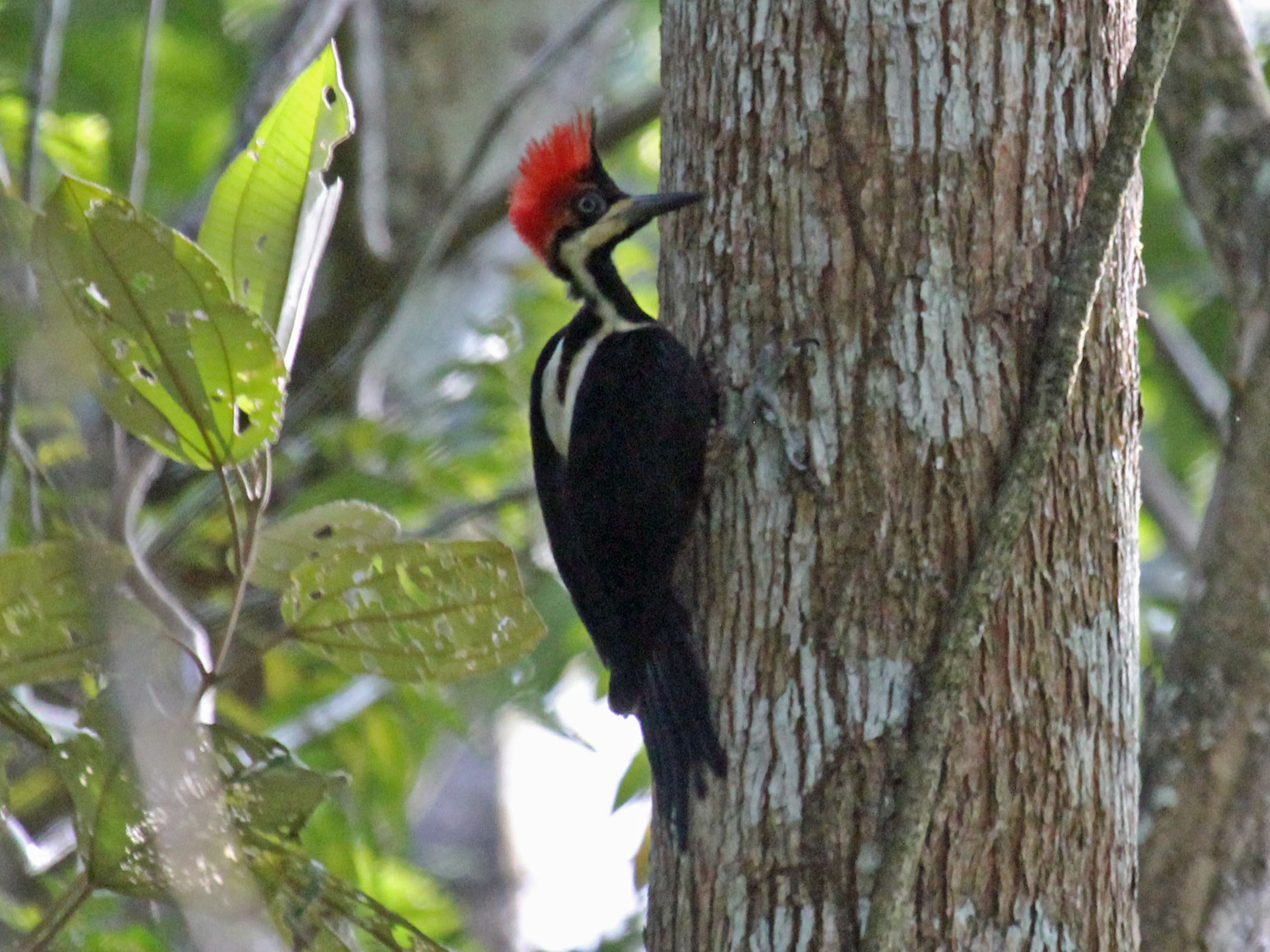
Female

== Description ==
The crimson-crested woodpecker is 33 to 36 cm (13 to 14 in) long and weighs 225 to 281 g (7.9 to 9.9 oz). It is one of the largest woodpeckers in its range, though the higher elevation powerful woodpecker (C. pollens) is roughly the same size. Both sexes of the nominate subspecies C. m. melanoleucos have black upperparts from nape to rump; their rump, wings, and tail are brownish black. They have vertical white stripes on the sides of their neck that continue onto their back and form a "V". Their flight feathers have pale white or yellow or yellowish white edges. Their throat, front and sides of their neck, and their upper breast are black. Their lower breast and belly are pale cinnamon buff to tawy with wide black bars. Their undertail coverts are pale yellow to yellowish white. Their bill is a long ivory chisel, their iris white to yellow, and their legs variable shades of gray. Adult males have a mostly red head with a white to pale yellow patch at the base of the bill and a small black and white spot on the ear coverts. Adult females are black around their eye and on front of their crest. They have a wide white stripe with black edges that extends from the bill to the ear coverts and continues narrower down the side of their neck. Juveniles resemble adult females but males have red on the side of their head and in both sexes all of the head's red is paler.

Subspecies C. m. malherbii has a gray rather than ivory bill and more red around the eyes than the nominate. Their underparts are a more extensive and deeper cinnamon-buff. Subspecies C. m. cearae is almost identical to the nominate but is smaller and has a disproportionately shorter tail.

== Distribution and habitat ==
The nominate subspecies of the crimson-crested woodpecker is by far the most widespread. It is found on Trinidad; from eastern Colombia east through Venezuela and the Guianas; on the east side of the Andes in eastern Ecuador, eastern Peru, northern Bolivia, and northern Paraguay; across most of Amazonian Brazil; and slightly into northeastern Argentina's Misiones Province. Subspecies C. m. malherbii is found across most of Panama and in northern and central Colombia. C. m. cearae is found in northeastern Brazil from Maranhão east to Ceará and south to Bahia.

The crimson-crested woodpecker inhabits a wide variety of landscapes, most of them forested. It favors large tracts of humid lowland forest such as terra firme, forest along rivers, and mature secondary forest. It also occurs in somewhat more open areas including plantations as long as tall trees are present.

== Behavior ==
=== Feeding ===
The crimson-crested woodpecker forages at any level of the forest, though it appears to favor the mid-level. It pecks, probes, digs, and scales bark to reach its prey, which is mostly insects such as beetles, butterflies and moths, and ants, both adult and larval. Some individuals have been observed feeding on termites, and small berries and seeds are also part of their diet. It often feeds on smaller branches than other similar-sized woodpeckers. Pairs typically forage together though they may be separated by several meters.

=== Breeding ===
The crimson-crested woodpecker breeds from November through January in Panama and February to April in Suriname; their season in Trinidad includes April and that in Colombia includes February. Their nesting season elsewhere has not been defined. Both sexes excavate the nest cavity, usually in a large-diameter tree, and drum and call to each other during the excavation period. One known clutch was of two eggs. Both parents incubate the eggs and provision nestlings and fledglings. The incubation period and time to fledging are not known.

=== Vocal and non-vocal sounds ===
The crimson-crested woodpecker is not highly vocal, but has a variety of calls. Its most frequent call during the breeding season is "a hollow, popping series of notes, sometimes delivered in a rapid chatter: tkep-tkep-tkep". Other calls between pairs are "kwirr kwirr-al", "wuk wuk, wrr wrr", and "uh uh". Alarm calls are "a repeated ca-wa-rr-r" and "a shrill put put puttas". The species' drum is "an initially strong blow, followed by a vibrating temble of weaker notes that is described as DA-drrr" Nest excavation produceds a steady drumming as well. In flight their wings make "a heavy sound".

== Status ==
The IUCN has assessed the crimson-crested woodpecker as being of Least Concern. It has an extremely large range and an estimated population of more than five million mature individuals, though the latter is believed to be decreasing. No immediate threats have been identified. "Deforestation has been the largest effect humans have had on this bird, as this species regularly loses 16.7-19.3% of suitable habitat about every 15 years. Human deforestation has cut down many of the open, continuous forests that this species requires."
