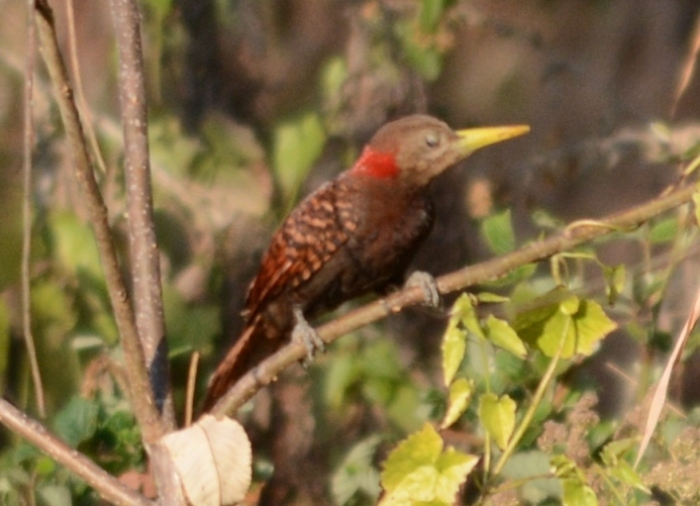

Conservation status
- Least Concern (IUCN 3.1)

Scientific classification
- Kingdom: Animalia
- Phylum: Chordata
- Class: Aves
- Order: Piciformes
- Family: Picidae
- Genus: Blythipicus
- Species: B. pyrrhotis

Binomial name
- Blythipicus pyrrhotis (Hodgson, 1837)

= Bay woodpecker =

Species of bird

The bay woodpecker (Blythipicus pyrrhotis) is a species of bird in the family Picidae.

It is found in Bangladesh, Bhutan, Cambodia, China, Hong Kong, India, Laos, Malaysia, Myanmar, Nepal, Thailand, and Vietnam. Its natural habitats are subtropical or tropical moist lowland forest and subtropical or tropical moist montane forest.

== Diet and nutrition ==
The bay woodpecker's diet consists of various insects such as ants, termites and wood-boring beetles, and they will also consume berries occasionally. They do most of their foraging 3–4 m below the surface level, on trunks, rotting snags, logs, and on saplings, vines and bamboo. They do not forage near other bay woodpeckers, but they maintain loose contact with their partners.

== Description ==
The bay woodpecker is a mid-size bird with a body length of 26.5–30 cm (10.4–11.8 in). The average adult bay woodpecker has a weight of 126–170 g (4.4–6.0 oz). Male bay woodpeckers can be distinguished by a brown crown on their heads, a short crest and nape with streaking, and a pale brown forehead. Female bay woodpeckers have a shorter bill than the males, as well as a pale head without any red on the neck. Bay woodpeckers are members of the Picidae bird family which also includes piculets, wrynecks, and sapsuckers.

== Song and call ==
The bay woodpecker has a long, dry rattle that they use as a contact between mates. Their territorial announcement can be heard over large distances.

== Distribution and habitat ==
Bay woodpeckers typically live in evergreen and mixed deciduous forests. They are found in heavily wooded ravines with dense growth. Bay woodpeckers are found in a variety of altitudes, ranging from as low as 50 m, and as high as 2750 m. Bay woodpeckers are most commonly found in the following South Asian countries: Bangladesh, Bhutan, Cambodia, China, India, Laos, Malaysia, Myanmar, Nepal, Thailand, and Vietnam.

== Subspecies ==
There are 5 subspecies of bay woodpeckers:

- Blythipicus pyrrhotis pyrrhotis: Eastern Nepal to south-central China, Laos, and northern Vietnam.
- Blythipicus pyrrhotis sinensis: South-eastern China.
- Blythipicus pyrrhotis annamensis: Southern Vietnam highlands.
- Blythipicus pyrrhotis hainanus: Hainan, China
- Blythipicus pyrrhotis cameroni: Malaysia

== Conservation status ==
The bay woodpecker is not globally threatened, but they are generally uncommon. Their population is currently on the decline due to habitat loss, but is not expected to approach the threshold of Vulnerable under the population trend criterion. According to this criterion, they are classified under the "least concern" category of extinction and endangerment. The global population size is currently unknown, but the population of bay woodpeckers in China, one of their primary habitats, is estimated to be at 10,000-100,000 breeding pairs.

== Breeding ==
Bay woodpeckers will use displays such as crest-raising and wing-flicking when calling for a mate. Both sexes will dig a nest hole that is low down (1–4 m) in live or dead wood. The parents will share incubation and brood-feeding.
