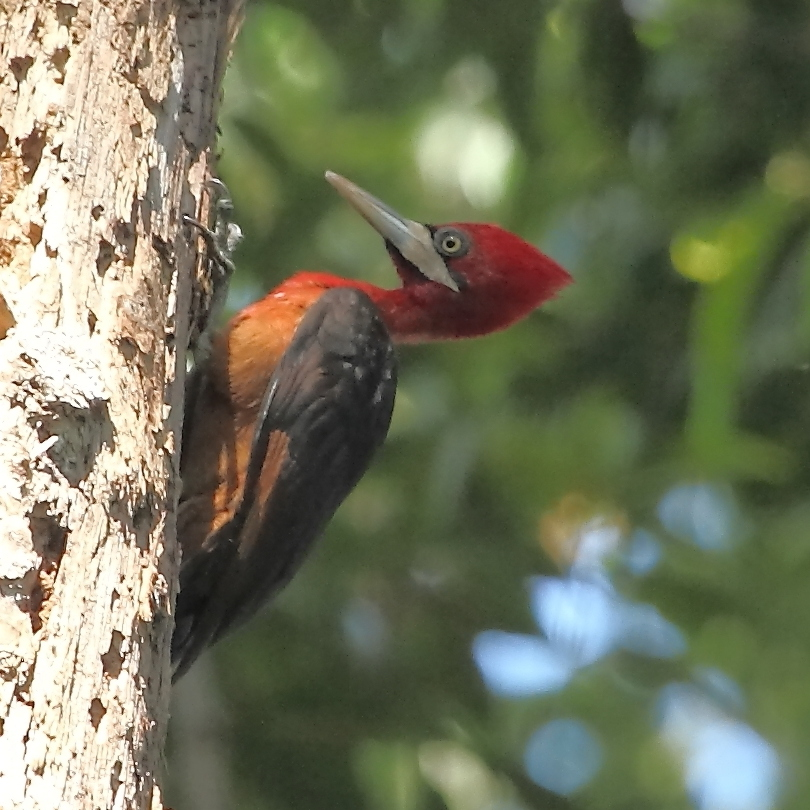
- female at Alta Floresta, Mato Grosso state, Brazil

Conservation status
- Least Concern (IUCN 3.1)

Scientific classification
- Kingdom: Animalia
- Phylum: Chordata
- Class: Aves
- Order: Piciformes
- Family: Picidae
- Genus: Campephilus
- Species: C. rubricollis

Binomial name
- Campephilus rubricollis (Boddaert, 1783)

= Red-necked woodpecker =

Species of bird

The red-necked woodpecker (Campephilus rubricollis) is a species of bird in subfamily Picinae of the woodpecker family Picidae. It is found in every mainland South American country except Argentina, Chile, Paraguay, and Uruguay.

== Taxonomy and systematics ==
The red-necked woodpecker was described by the French polymath Georges-Louis Leclerc, Comte de Buffon in 1780 in his Histoire Naturelle des Oiseaux from a specimen collected in Cayenne, French Guiana. The bird was also illustrated in a hand-colored plate engraved by François-Nicolas Martinet in the Planches Enluminées D'Histoire Naturelle which was produced under the supervision of Edme-Louis Daubenton to accompany Buffon's text. Neither the plate caption nor Buffon's description included a scientific name, but in 1783 the Dutch naturalist Pieter Boddaert coined the binomial name Picus rubricollis in his catalogue of the Planches Enluminées. The red-necked woodpecker was for a time placed in genus Scapaneus that was later merged into genus Phloeoceastes. The latter was itself merged into the current genus Campephilus that was introduced by the English zoologist George Robert Gray in 1840. The genus name combines the Ancient Greek kampē meaning "caterpillar" and philos meaning "loving". The specific epithet rubricollis combines the Latin ruber meaning "red" with -collis meaning "-necked".

Three subspecies are recognixed:

- C. r. rubricollis (Boddaert, 1783)
- C. r. trachelopyrus (Malherbe, 1857)
- C. r. olallae (Gyldenstolpe, 1945)

Subspecies C. r. trachelopyrus was for a time in the early 20th century treated as a separate species.

== Description ==
The red-necked woodpecker is about 30 to 35 cm (12 to 14 in) long and weighs 178 to 236 g (6.3 to 8.3 oz). Both sexes of the nominate subspecies C. r. rubricollis have black to brownish black upperparts. Their wings' upper surface is black with rufous on the flight feathers' inner vanes. The wings' underside is rufous with a blackish trailing edge and feather tips. Their tail is black above and brownish black below. Their underparts are bright red on the breast becoming rufous to rufous cinnamon at the vent. Adult males have an entirely red head and neck with a small black and white spot on the ear coverts. Adult females do not have the covert spot. They do have a wide whitish strip with black edges that extends from the bill to the ear coverts. Their bill is a long pale grayish white to ivory chisel, their iris yellowish white, and their legs blackish gray or olive. Juveniles resemble adults but are duller and browner; their red parts are more orange.

Subspecies C. r. trachelopyrus is larger and darker than the nominate. Its underparts are more chestnut than red and the wing has more rufous on its upper side. C. r. olallae is between the other two subspecies in size. Its colors, too, are intermediate, with its red and rufous being brighter than those of trachelopyrus but not as bright as the nominate's.

== Distribution and habitat ==
The red-necked woodpecker's subspecies are found thus:

- C. r. rubricollis, eastern Colombia and eastern Ecuador through southern Venezuela and the Guianas and into northern Brazil north of the Amazon
- C. r. trachelopyrus, northeastern Peru, west-central Bolivia, and western Brazil south of the Amazon
- C. r. olallae, Brazil south of the Amazon between the Madeira River and the Atlantic coast in Maranhão, and south to Mato Grosso and central Bolivia

The red-necked woodpecker is a bird of the Amazon Basin, where it inhabits rain-, terra firme, and várzea forests. It tends to favor the forest interior but also occurs at its edges, in secondary forest, and in woodland along watercourses in savannah. In elevation it mostly ranges between sea level and 600 m (2,000 ft) though it locally reaches 1,800 m (5,900 ft) in southern Venezuela and northwestern Brazil and 2,400 m (7,900 ft) in Bolivia.

== Behavior ==
=== Movement ===
The red-necked woodpecker is a year-round resident throughout its range.

=== Feeding ===
The red-necked woodpecker mostly forages on trunks and limbs from the forest's mid level to near the canopy though it also hunts near the ground on rotten stubs. It usually forages in pairs or small family groups. Its diet is not known in detail but includes the larvae of beetles and moths and some fruit.

=== Breeding ===
The red-necked woodpecker breeds between January and May in the north, during November in Ecuador, and during September in Peru. Its nest cavity is usually high up in a dead tree or palm. The clutch size is believed to be two to four eggs. Nothing else is known about its breeding biology.

=== Vocal and non-vocal sounds ===
The red-necked woodpecker's most common vocalization is "an explosive nasal call (ngkah-ngkah or kikka) that is given repeatedly". It also makes "churring calls (ca-wa-rr-r)" when agitated. Its drum is "a loud double-rap". Its foraging taps vary in volume; its wings are often noisy in flight.

== Status ==
The IUCN has assessed the red-necked woodpecker as being of Least Concern. It has an extremely large range but its population size is not known and is believed to be decreasing. No immediate threats have been identified. However, "suitable habitat for this forest dwelling species disappears when areas within its range are substantially deforested, cut over or reforested as secondary growth or exotic tree plantations."
