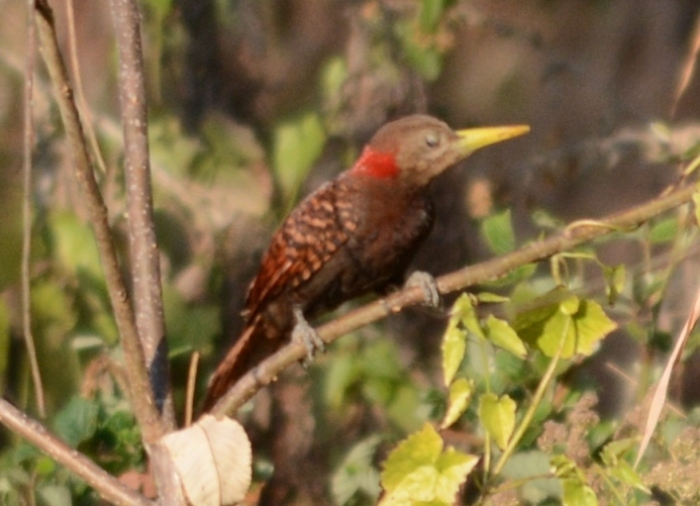

Scientific classification
- Kingdom: Animalia
- Phylum: Chordata
- Class: Aves
- Order: Piciformes
- Family: Picidae
- Tribe: Campephilini
- Genus: Blythipicus; Bonaparte, 1854

Type species
- Picus rubiginosus Swainson, 1837

Species
- 2, see text

= Blythipicus =

Genus of birds

Blythipicus is a genus of birds in the woodpecker family Picidae that are found in Southeast Asia.

== Taxonomy ==
The genus was introduced by the French ornithologist Charles Lucien Bonaparte in 1854. The name was chosen to honour the English zoologist Edward Blyth whose name is combined with the Latin picus meaning "woodpecker". The type species was subsequently designated as the maroon woodpecker (Blythipicus rubiginosus) by the English zoologist George Robert Gray in 1855. The genus is in the tribe Campephilini, one of five tribes that make up the woodpecker subfamily Picinae. The genus Blythipicus is sister to a clade containing the genera Reinwardtipicus and Chrysocolaptes.

=== Species ===
The genus contains two species:

Genus Blythipicus – Bonaparte, 1854 – two species
Common name	Scientific name and subspecies	Range	Size and ecology	IUCN status and estimated population
Maroon woodpecker	Blythipicus rubiginosus (Swainson, 1837)	Brunei, Indonesia, Malaysia, southern Myanmar, Singapore, and southern Thailand.	Size: Habitat: Diet:	LC
Bay woodpecker	Blythipicus pyrrhotis (Hodgson, 1837) Five subspecies: B. p. pyrrhotis; B. p. sinensis; B. p. annamensis; B. p. hainanus; B. p. cameroni	Bangladesh, Bhutan, Cambodia, China, Hong Kong, India, Laos, Malaysia, Myanmar, Nepal, Thailand, and Vietnam.	Size: Habitat: Diet:	LC
