= List of terms used in bird topography =

The following is a list of terms used in bird topography:

== Plumage features ==
External anatomy of a typical bird: 1 Beak, 2 Head, 3 Iris, 4 Pupil, 5 Mantle, 6 Lesser coverts, 7 Scapulars, 8 Coverts, 9 Tertials, 10 Rump, 11 Primaries, 12 Vent, 13 Thigh, 14 Tibio-tarsal articulation, 15 Tarsus, 16 Feet, 17 Tibia, 18 Belly, 19 Flanks, 20 Breast, 21 Throat, 22 Wattle, 23 Eyestripe

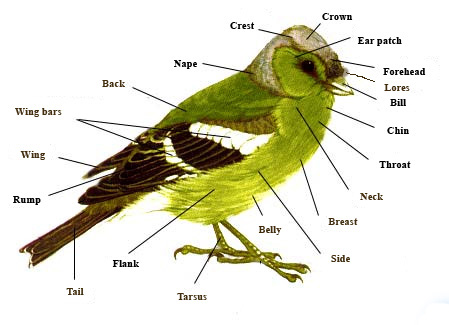
Topography of a typical passerine.

- Back
- Belly
- Breast
- Cheek
- Chin
- Crest
- Crown
- Crown patch
- Ear-coverts
- Eye-ring
- Eyestripe (or eye line)
- Feather, see category: Category:Feathers
- Flanks
- Forecrown
- Gorget
- Hood (or half-hood)
- Lateral throat stripe
- Lores
- Malar
- Mantle
- Mask
- Moustachial stripe
- Nape
- Nuchal collar
- Operculum (on pigeons).
- Pennaceous feathers
- Postocular stripe
- Remiges
- Rump
- Spectacles
- Submoustachial stripe
- Supercilium
- Supraloral
- Parts of the tail include:
  - Rectrices
  - Tail corner
  - Terminal band
    - Subterminal band
- Throat
- Undertail coverts
- Upper mandible (or maxilla)
- Uppertail coverts
- Vent, crissum or cloaca
  - Vent band
- Parts of the wings include:
  - Alula
  - Apical spot
  - Axillar
  - Bend of wing
  - Carpal covert
  - Emargination
  - Greater coverts
  - Leading edge of wing
  - Lesser coverts
  - Marginal coverts
  - Median coverts
  - Mirror (on gulls)
  - Primaries
    - Primary projection
    - Primary numbers (e.g. 1, 2, 3, etc.)
  - Scapulars
    - Scapular crescent (on gulls)
  - Secondaries
  - Speculum
  - Tertials
    - Tertial step (on gulls)
  - Trailing edge of wing
  - Upper scapulars
  - Wing bar
  - Wing coverts
  - Wing edging
  - Wing linings
  - Wing tip or point (denoted by the number of the longest primary, counted from the carpal joint)

== Bare-parts features ==
- Beak or bill
  - Cere
  - Culmen
  - Gape
  - Gonys
    - Gonydeal angle
    - Gonydeal spot
  - Nail (of beak)
  - Nares
  - Rhamphotheca
    - Gnathotheca
    - Rhinotheca
  - Tomia
- Brooding patch
- Caruncle (bird anatomy)
- Comb, or Coxcomb
- Orbital skin, or orbital ring
- Tarsus
- Tibia
- Wattle

== See also ==
- Glossary of bird terms
