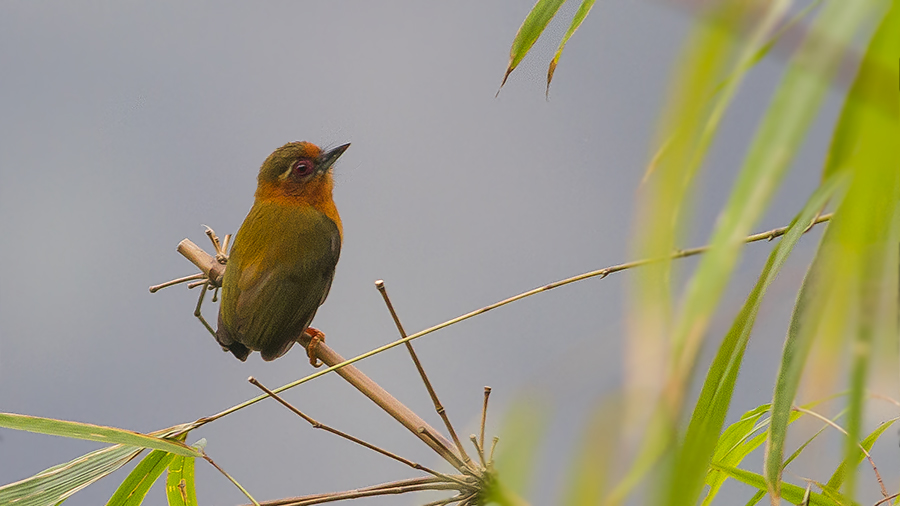
- From Khangchendzonga National Park, West Sikkim, India.

Conservation status
- Least Concern (IUCN 3.1)

Scientific classification
- Kingdom: Animalia
- Phylum: Chordata
- Class: Aves
- Order: Piciformes
- Family: Picidae
- Genus: Sasia
- Species: S. ochracea

Binomial name
- Sasia ochracea Hodgson, 1837

= White-browed piculet =

Species of bird

The white-browed piculet (Sasia ochracea) is a species of bird in the family Picidae. It is found in Bangladesh, Bhutan, Cambodia, India, Laos, Myanmar, Nepal, Thailand, and Vietnam. Its natural habitats are temperate forests and subtropical or tropical moist montane forests.

== Description ==
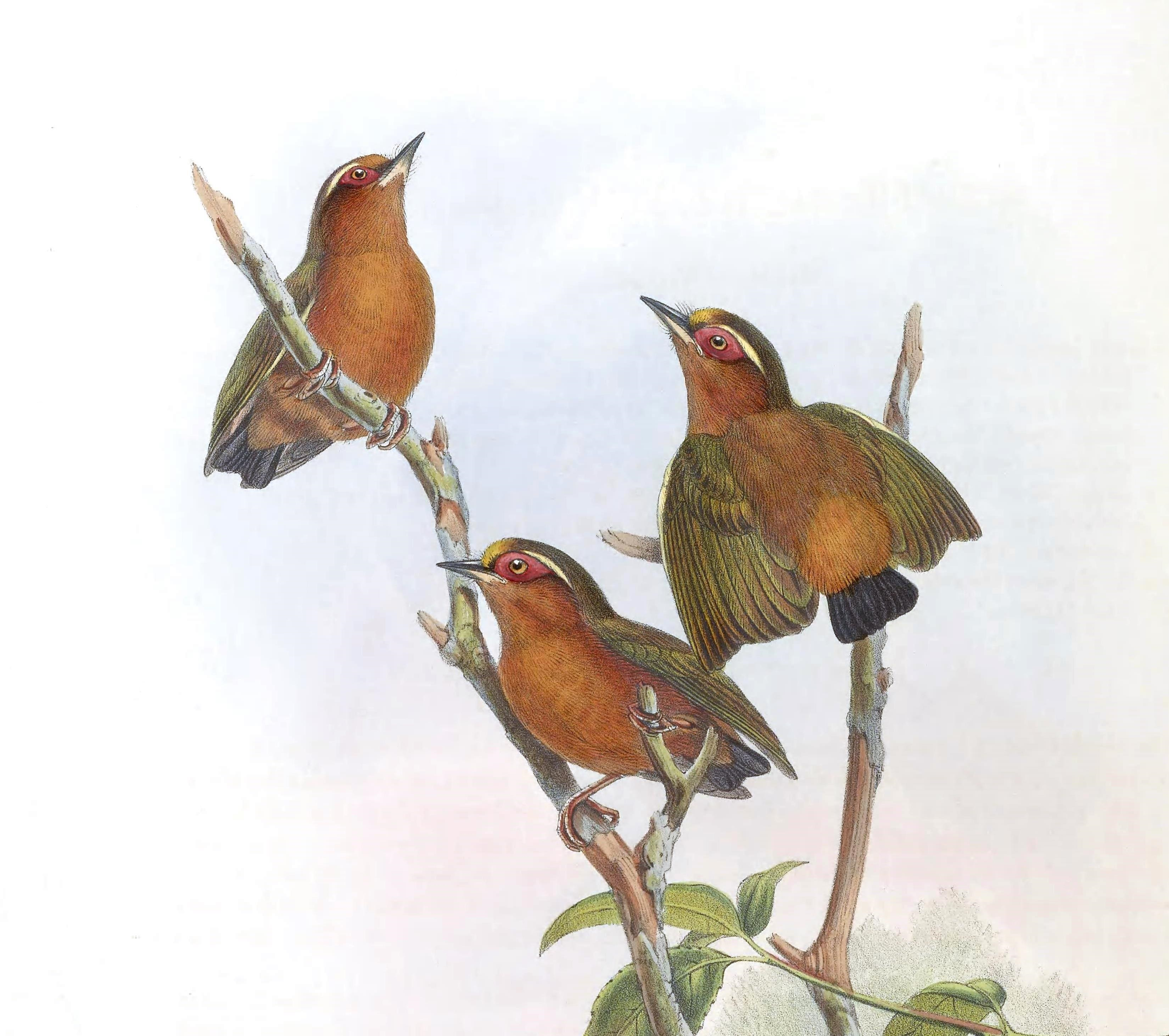
Illustration by John Gould

This small piculet has olive-green upper parts tinged with chestnut and grows to a length of up to 10 cm (4 in). The under parts are cinnamon or rufous, sometimes yellowish on the flanks. The stubby tail is blackish. The crown is green, and there is a white streak above and immediately behind the eye, the latter being surrounded by a ring of bare pinkish or reddish skin. Males have a small golden-yellow patch on the forehead which females lack. Juveniles are duller in colour than adults, greener above and greyer beneath. The beak is grey, the iris is red and the legs are yellow or orange, the feet having just three toes, (four being the norm in the woodpecker family). In southern Myanmar and southeastern Thailand, where their ranges overlap, the white-browed piculet can be confused with the very similar rufous piculet (Sasia abnormis), but differs in the white streak above the eye and the darker beak.

== Distribution and habitat ==
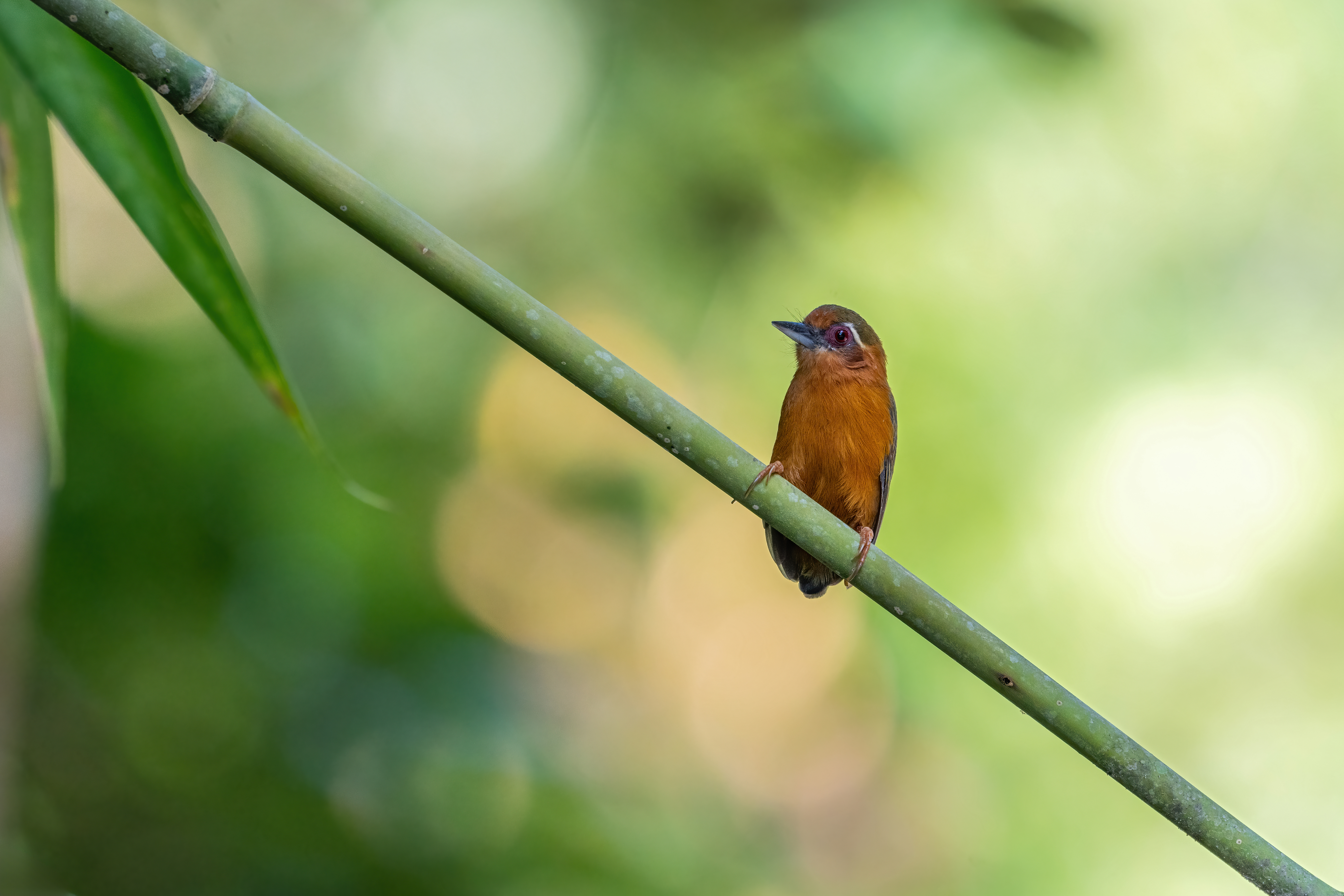
White-browed Piculet in Nepal.

The white-browed piculet is native to tropical southeastern Asia. Its range extends from northern India, Nepal, Bhutan and Bangladesh through southern China to Myanmar, Laos, Vietnam and Thailand. Its home is dense wet or dry forest with plenty of vines and bamboo, scrub and swampy woodlands. It is found at altitudes of up to 2,600 m (8,500 ft).

== Ecology ==
In Kaeng Krachan National Park, Thailand

It forages in the understory layer not far above the ground, pecking and probing with its sharp beak. Its diet consists of small insects, bark beetles, ants, termites, spiders and other small invertebrates. It often forages in pairs or may join small flocks of mixed species, sometimes descending to the ground, where it may hop for short distances.

This bird uses pieces of bamboo to make its nest. It picks up bits of broken bamboo with its feet, and uses its beak to pull away partially broken fragments. Breeding takes place between March and July.

== Status ==
The white-browed piculet is described as a fairly common bird and has a very extensive range. No particular threats to this bird are known and, in the absence of evidence to the contrary, the population is believed to be stable. For these reasons, the International Union for Conservation of Nature has assessed this bird's conservation status as being of "least concern".
