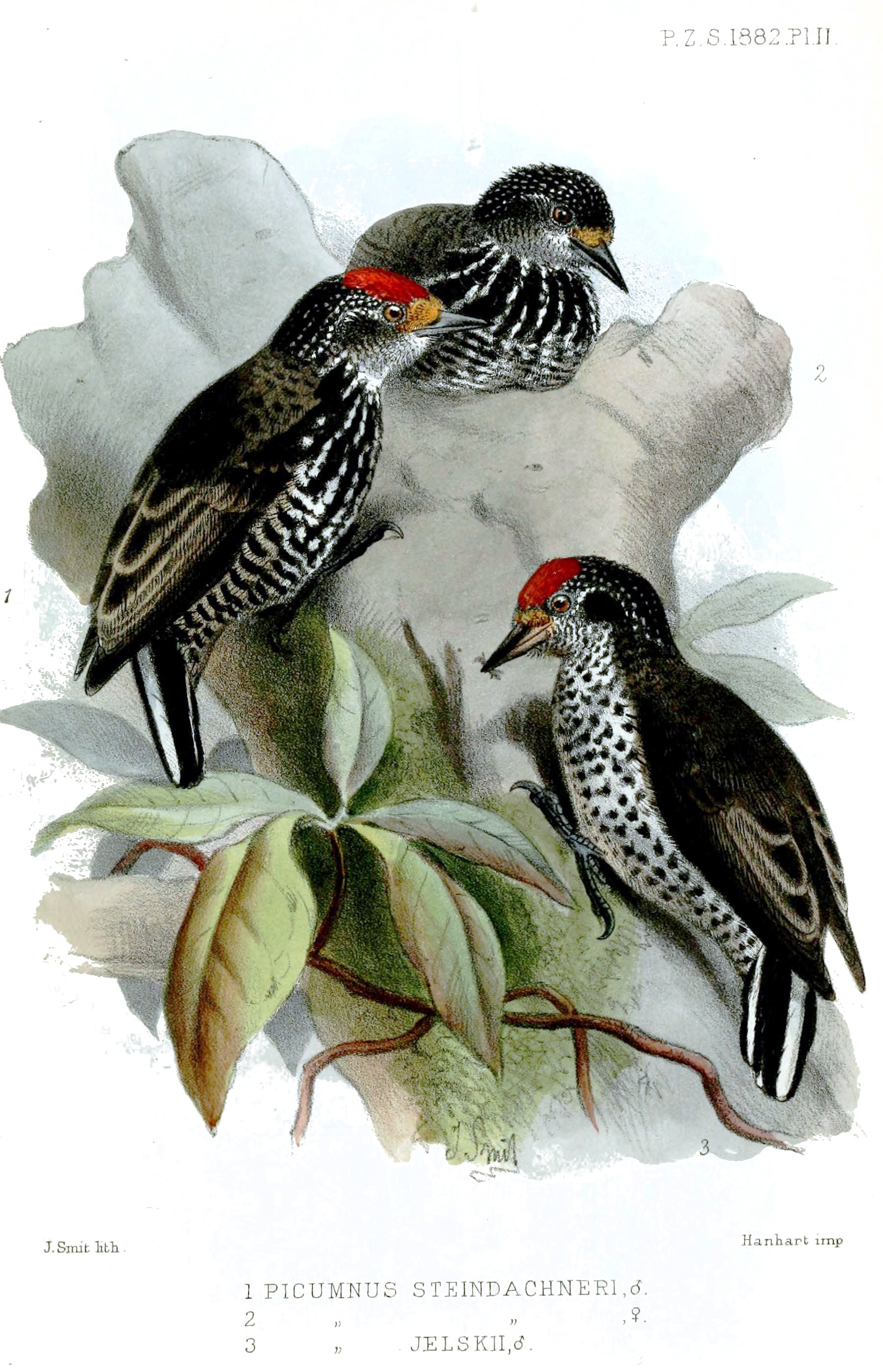
- Male and female speckle-chested piculet (above), male ocellated piculet below

Conservation status
- Least Concern (IUCN 3.1)

Scientific classification
- Kingdom: Animalia
- Phylum: Chordata
- Class: Aves
- Order: Piciformes
- Family: Picidae
- Genus: Picumnus
- Species: P. dorbignyanus

Binomial name
- Picumnus dorbignyanus Lafresnaye, 1845

Synonyms
- Picumnus d'Orbignyanus

= Ocellated piculet =

Species of woodpecker

The ocellated piculet (Picumnus dorbignyanus) is a species of bird in subfamily Picumninae of the woodpecker family Picidae. It is found in Bolivia and Peru and possibly Argentina.

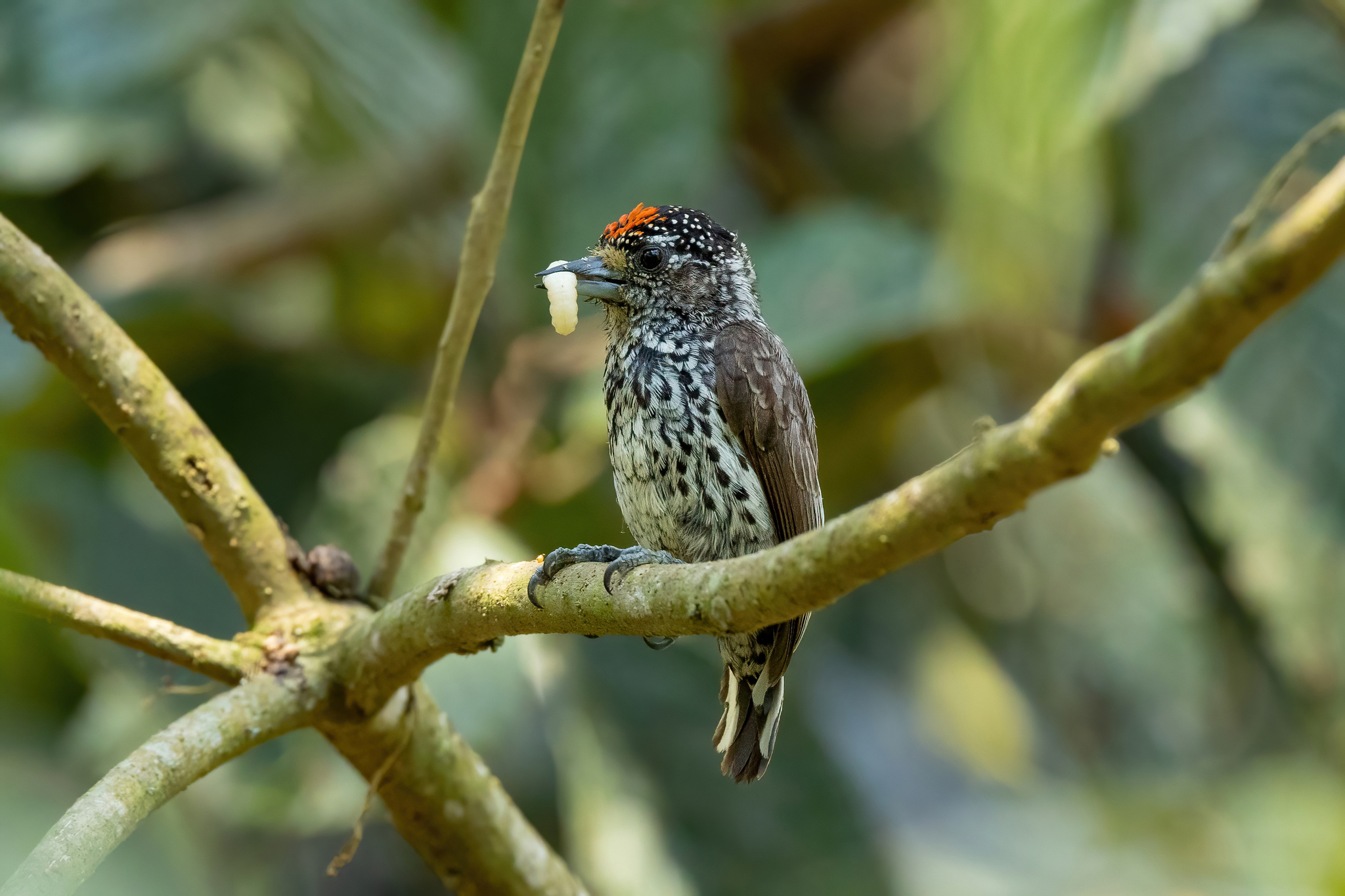
On branch

== Taxonomy and systematics ==
The ocellated piculet was first described in 1845 by the French ornithologist Frédéric de Lafresnaye as Picumnus d'Orbignyanus, named in honor of the French naturalist Alcide d'Orbigny. Since then the name has often been misspelled as P. dorbygnianus.

The ocellated piculet has two subspecies, the nominate P. d. dorbignyanus and P. d. jelskii (Taczanowski, 1882). However, the species' taxonomy and that of genus Picnumnus in general are uncertain. The two subspecies have at times been treated as separate species and also as subspecies of the white-barred piculet (P. cirratus). In addition, at times other subspecies have been attributed to it. The ocellated piculet is closely related to the white-barred piculet and the ochre-collared piculet (P. temminckii) and at times these species have been treated as synonymous. The ocellated piculet hybridizes with the white-barred piculet where their ranges overlap.

== Description ==
The ocellated piculet is 9 to 10 cm (3.5 to 3.9 in) long and weighs 7 to 11 g (0.25 to 0.39 oz). Adult males of the nominate subspecies have a black cap with red tips on the forehead feathers and small white spots on the rest of the cap. Their face is mostly buff-brown with faint blackish bars and a white stripe behind the eye. Their upperparts are dull brownish, sometimes with faint whitish bars. Their flight feathers are dark brown with buffish white edges and tips. Their tail is dark brown; the innermost pair of feathers have mostly white inner webs and the outer two pairs have a white stripe near the end. Their chin and throat feathers are white tinged with buff and with dark edges or tips. Their breast and flank feathers are white with narrow black shafts and edges; their belly is buffy white. Their iris is brown, the orbital ring gray, and the legs gray. Their beak's maxilla is black with a blue-gray base and its mandible blue-gray with a black tip. Adult females are identical but for no red on the forehead. Juveniles are duller and darker than adults and have a sooty crown and diffuse barring on the upper- and underparts.

Subspecies P. d. jelskii is very similar to the nominate, but its breast feathers have wide black streaks on the shafts and fewer dark edges. Its forehead feathers have broader red tips.

== Distribution and habitat ==
Subspecies P. d. jelskii of the ocellated piculet is found in central Peru between the departments of Huánuco and Cuzco. The nominate subspecies is found in western Bolivia and possibly into extreme northwestern Argentina. The Clements taxonomy and Cornell Lab of Ornithology's online Birds of the World include Argentina but the South American Classification Committee of the American Ornithological Society and the International Ornithological Committee do not.

The ocellated piculet inhabits the interior and edges of humid montane forest and mature secondary forest. It favors bushy undergrowth with vines, creepers, and epiphytes. In elevation it ranges between 800 and 2,400 m (2,600 and 7,900 ft) in Peru and from 900 to 3,300 m (3,000 to 10,800 ft) in Bolivia.

== Behavior ==
=== Movement ===
The ocellated piculet is generally sedentary but may move to lower elevations in winter.

=== Feeding ===
The ocellated piculet forages along thin branches and vines, moving singly or in pairs usually as part of a mixed species foraging flock. Its diet has not been studied but is known to include insects.

=== Breeding ===
The ocellated piculet nests in holes but nothing else is known about it breeding biology.

=== Vocalization ===
The ocellated piculet's song is "a high-pitched, rapid, falling trill: tree'e'e'e'e'e'e".

== Status ==
The IUCN has assessed the ocellated piculet as being of Least Concern. It has a fairly large range, and though its population size is not known it is believed to be stable. No immediate threats have been identified. It is thought to be generally uncommon but locally common. "Human activity has little short-term direct effect on the Ocellated Piculet, other than the local effects of habitat destruction."
