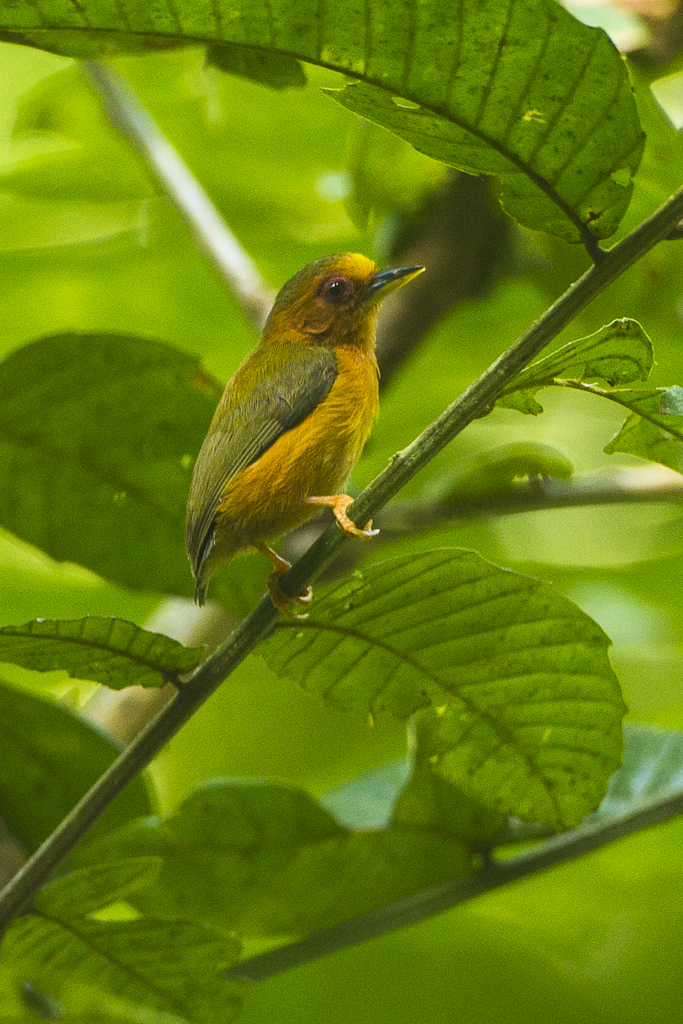

Conservation status
- Least Concern (IUCN 3.1)

Scientific classification
- Kingdom: Animalia
- Phylum: Chordata
- Class: Aves
- Order: Piciformes
- Family: Picidae
- Genus: Sasia
- Species: S. abnormis

Binomial name
- Sasia abnormis (Temminck, 1825)

= Rufous piculet =

Species of bird

The rufous piculet (Sasia abnormis) is a species of bird in the family Picidae. It is found in Brunei, Indonesia, Malaysia, Myanmar, and Thailand. Its natural habitats are subtropical or tropical moist lowland forests and subtropical or tropical moist montane forests. This species is one of the world's smallest woodpeckers and is the smallest woodpecker found outside the Americas. In this species the length can range from 8 to 10 cm (3 to 4 in) and the average body mass is around 9.2 g (0.32 oz).

== Description ==
The rufous piculet is a very small bird with short wings and an almost non-existent tail, ranging in length from 8 to 10 cm (3 to 4 in). The upper parts are generally green tinted with bronze, and the underparts rufous, orange or cinnamon, with paler flanks. The mantle and back are olive, the wings are brownish above, and the underwings are buff. The stumpy tail is blackish above, edged with olive. The sexes are different; the male has a yellow or golden patch on the forehead whereas the female has a bronze patch. They also differ in that the female has a larger beak. The upper mandible in both sexes is blackish and the lower mandible yellowish. The iris is reddish and there is a pinkish or purplish ring of bare skin around the eye. The legs and feet are yellowish or orange, and this piculet has just three toes on each foot, (four being normal in the woodpecker family). The juvenile is rather more grey.

== Distribution and habitat ==
The rufous piculet is native to tropical southeastern Asia. Its range extends from southern Myanmar, through Thailand and the Malay Peninsula to the Greater Sunda Islands and Borneo. It is a resident and sedentary species, generally restricted to the lowlands and hills, but at altitudes of up to about 1,600 m (5,200 ft) in Borneo. Its typical habitat is dense humid secondary forests with tangled undergrowth, vines, creepers, bamboos and dead and rotting trees, often near streams.

== Ecology ==
The rufous piculet is an active bird moving singly or in small groups through the lowest storeys of the forest, usually not above 5 m (16 ft) from the ground. It forages on trunks and dead branches, on vines, in bushes, among bamboos and in tall grasses. It gleans scrupulously, probing into holes and pulling out insects with its long tongue. It sometimes works its way up a trunk in a crosswise fashion, making little flights so as to turn to face the other way, the several members of a group often working in synchrony. The diet consists of ants, their larvae, termites, small beetles, spiders and other small invertebrates.

In Borneo the breeding season is in February while in Malaysia, nestlings have been found in May and June. Sometimes the nest is in a hole in a dead branch, and at other times it may be in bamboo.

== Status ==
The rufous piculet is a fairly common or common bird and has a very extensive range, estimated to be nearly 5,000,000 km^{2} (2,000,000 mi^{2}). Its range extends from sea level up to about 1,370 m (4,500 ft). No particular threats to this bird are known and the population is believed to be stable, so the International Union for Conservation of Nature has assessed its conservation status as being of "least concern".
