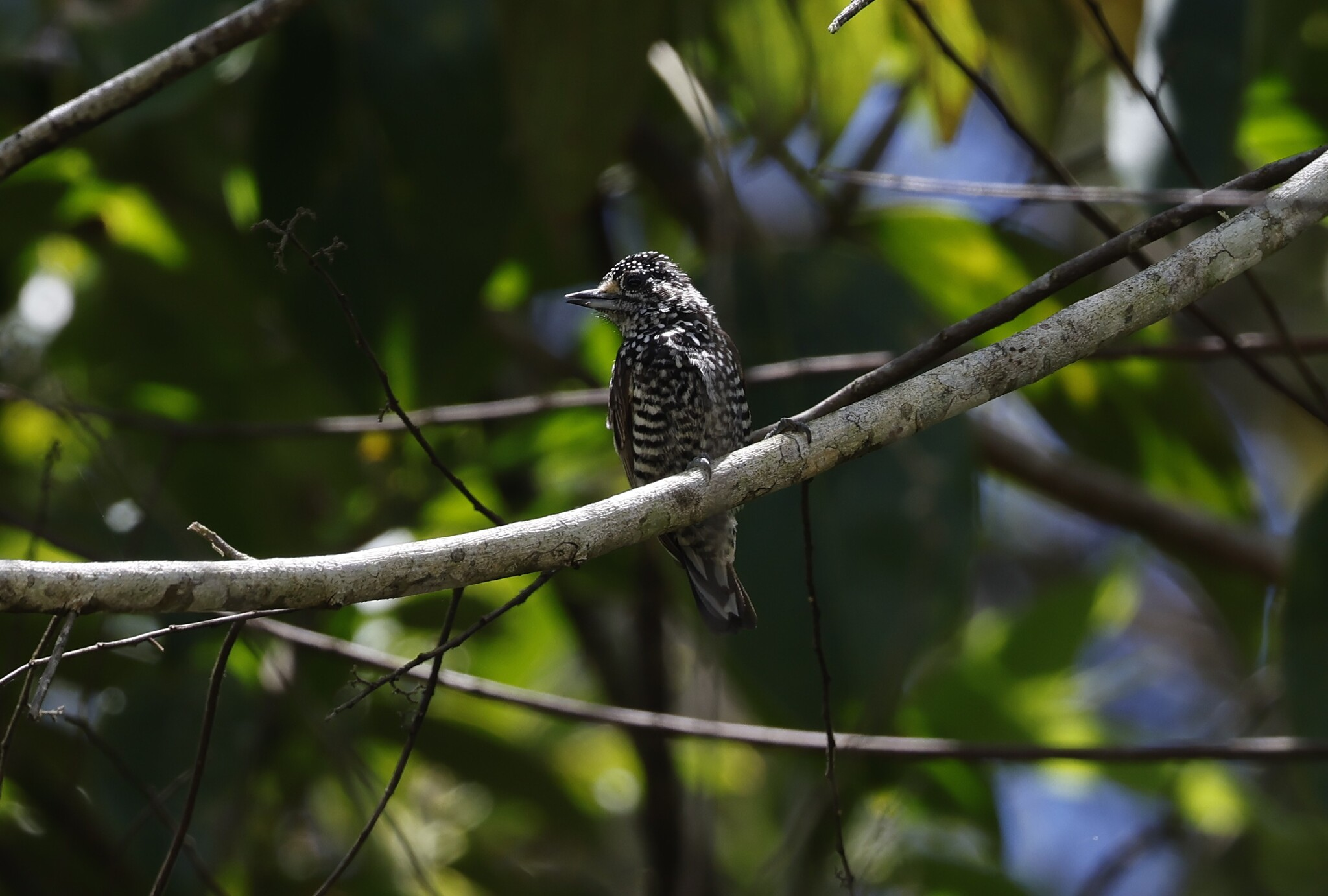

Conservation status
- Near Threatened (IUCN 3.1)

Scientific classification
- Kingdom: Animalia
- Phylum: Chordata
- Class: Aves
- Order: Piciformes
- Family: Picidae
- Genus: Picumnus
- Species: P. steindachneri

Binomial name
- Picumnus steindachneri Taczanowski, 1882

= Speckle-chested piculet =

Species of woodpecker

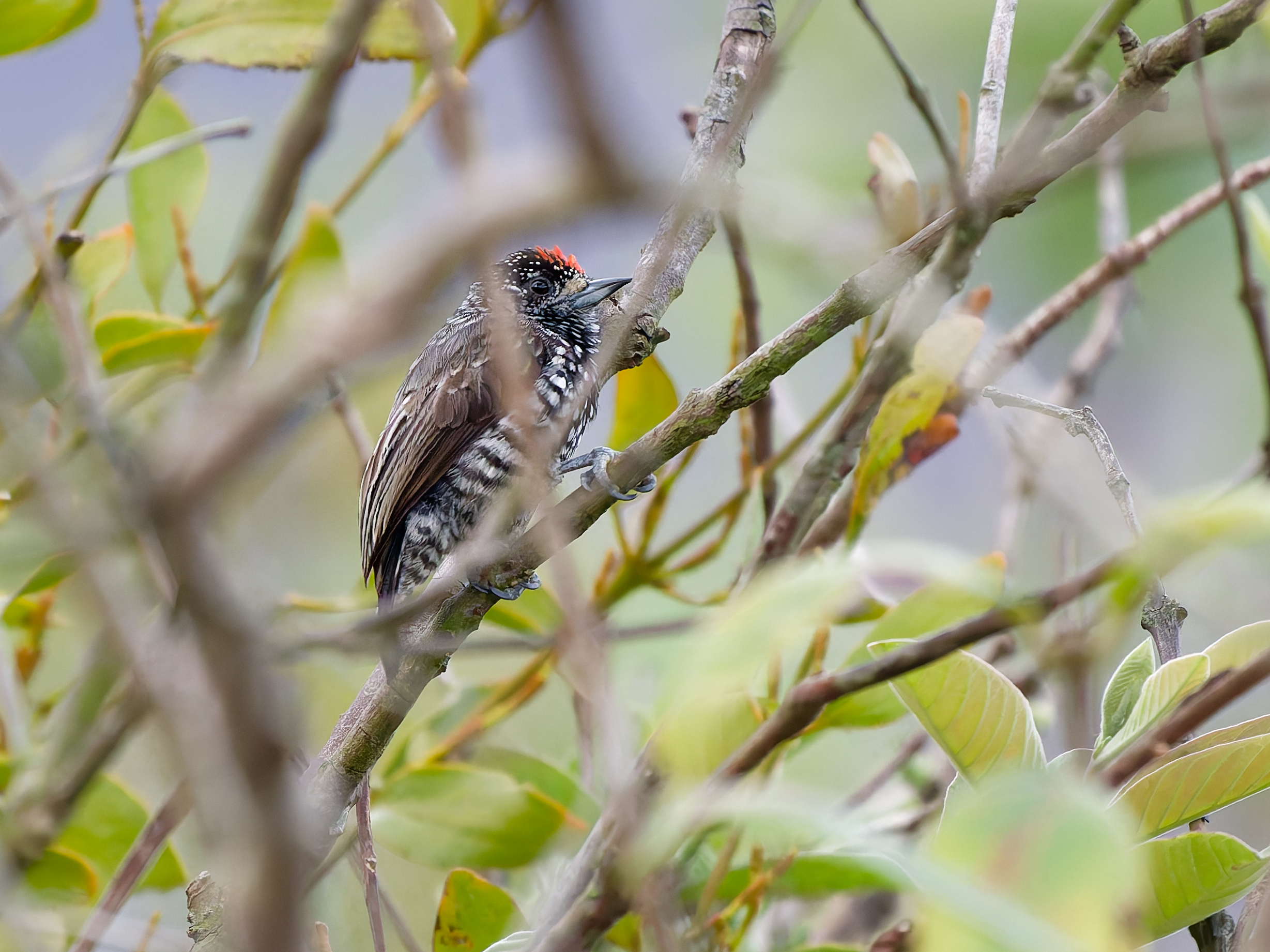
Speckle-chested Piculet in Peru

The speckle-chested piculet (Picumnus steindachneri) is a species of bird in subfamily Picumninae of the woodpecker family Picidae. It is endemic to Peru.

== Taxonomy and systematic ==
The speckle-chested piculet is monotypic.

== Description ==
The speckle-chested piculet is 9 to 10 cm (3.5 to 3.9 in) long and weighs about 10 g (0.35 oz). Adult males have a black cap with a red patch on the forehead and white spots on the rest of it. Their upperparts are grayish brown whose feathers have pale gray edges and dark marks near the end that give a scalloped appearance. Their rump is paler. Their flight feathers are brown with pale gray or off-white edges on the secondaries and tertials. Their tail is blackish; the innermost pair of feathers have mostly white inner webs and the outer two pairs have a white patch near the end. Their chin and throat feathers are white with black tips. Their breast is black with large teardrop shaped white spots, and their belly and undertail coverts are white with wide black bars. Adult females are identical but with small white spots instead of red on the forehead.

== Distribution and habitat ==
The speckle-chested piculet is endemic to a very small area of Peru. It is known only from the central Huallaga Valley and certain parts of the Utcubamba Valley in the foothills of the eastern Andes. Other nearby areas with similar habitat have not been explored so the species' range possibly is larger. It mostly inhabits humid lowland primary forest and montane forest with vines, epiphytes and bamboos, but it also occurs in mature secondary forest. In elevation it ranges between 1,000 and 2,300 m (3,300 and 7,500 ft).

== Behavior ==
=== Feeding ===
The speckle-chested piculet apparently forages mostly in the forest canopy but also has been observed feeding at lower levels as well. It feeds alone, in pairs, or in small family groups and often joins mixed-species foraging flocks. Its diet has not been studied but is assumed to be mostly insects.

=== Breeding ===
Juvenile speckle-chested piculets have been noted in late August and early September but nothing else is known about the species' breeding season, nest, eggs, or the rest of its breeding biology.

=== Vocal and non-vocal sounds ===
The speckle-chested piculet's song is "a high-pitched, rapid, falling trill: tree'e'e'e'e'e'e." Its "vigorous tapping during foraging can produce a distinctive rattling sound."

== Status ==
The speckle-chested piculet was originally as Near Threatened (Vulnerable from 2000 – 2012; Endangered from 2012 – 2023). As of 2023, it is again assessed as Near Threatened on the IUCN Red List. It is known from only a few locations across a very limited range. Its population is estimated at between 6000 and 15,000 mature individuals and is believed to be decreasing. The primary threat is continuing deforestation for timber and clearance for coffee plantations, cattle grazing, and other agriculture. It has been noted as uncommon to fairly common at scattered sites. "Although the Speckle-chested Piculet can tolerate second growth, at least tall second growth near tall forest, it remains forest dependent, and is very vulnerable to widespread habitat destruction."
