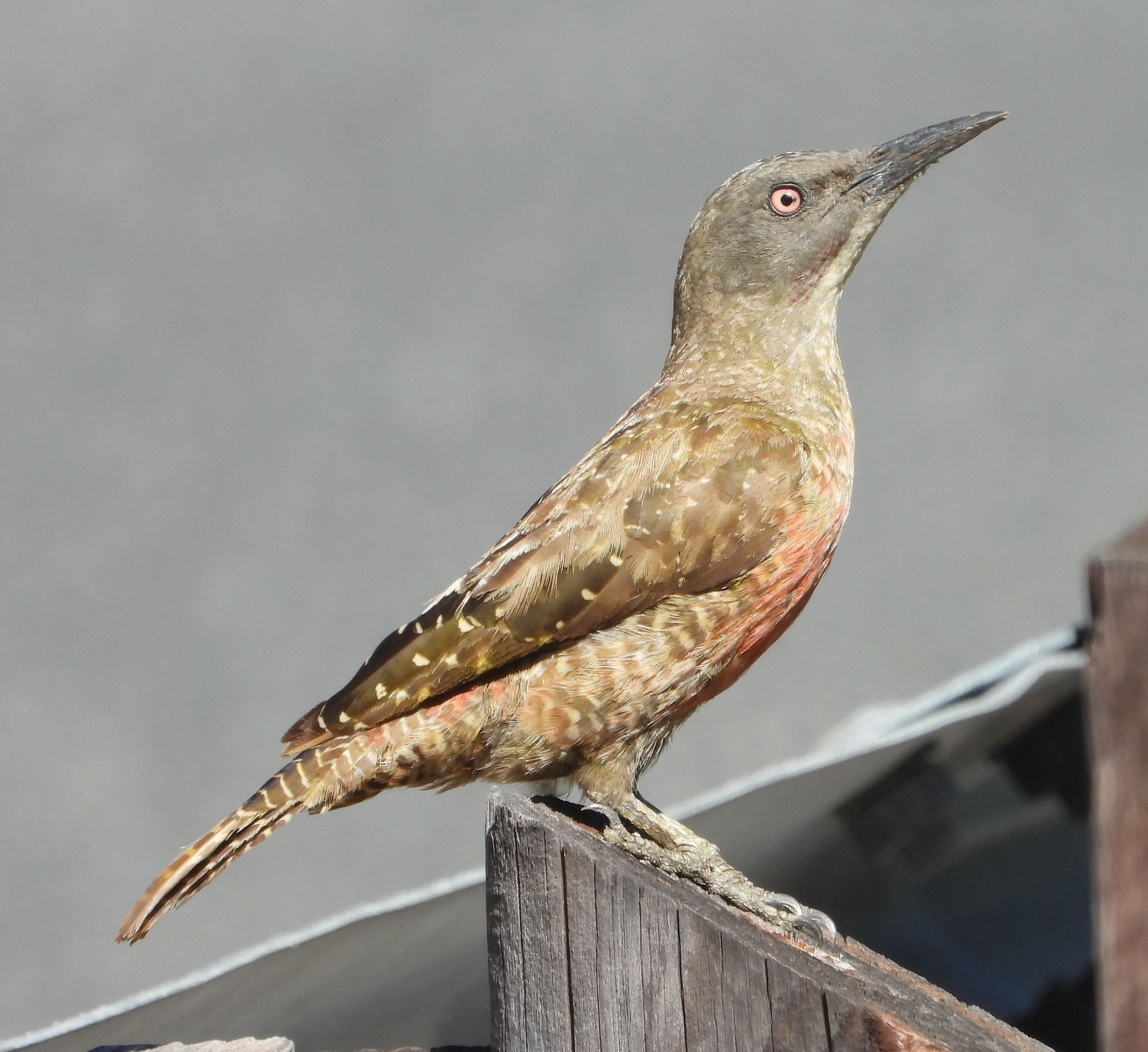
- In South Africa

Conservation status
- Near Threatened (IUCN 3.1)

Scientific classification
- Kingdom: Animalia
- Phylum: Chordata
- Class: Aves
- Order: Piciformes
- Family: Picidae
- Genus: Geocolaptes; Swainson, 1832
- Species: G. olivaceus

Binomial name
- Geocolaptes olivaceus (Gmelin, 1788)

= Ground woodpecker =

Species of bird

The ground woodpecker (Geocolaptes olivaceus) is one of only three ground-dwelling woodpeckers in the world (the others are the Andean and campo flickers). It inhabits rather barren, steep, boulder-strewn slopes in relatively cool hilly and mountainous areas of South Africa, Lesotho and Eswatini and has yet to be recorded outside of Southern Africa. It is found in a broad swath running from southwest to northeast, from the Cape Peninsula and Namaqualand to Mpumalanga. It is closely related to the woodpeckers of the genus Campethera, some of which also employ terrestrial foraging strategies.

== Taxonomy ==
The ground woodpecker was described in 1782 by the English ornithologist John Latham from a specimen collected from the Cape of Good Hope in South Africa. He used the English name "Crimson woodpecker" but did not introduce a Latin name. When the German naturalist Johann Friedrich Gmelin updated Carl Linnaeus's Systema Naturae for the 13th edition in 1788 he included a short description of the ground woodpecker, cited Latham's work and coined the binomial name Picus olivaceus. The ground woodpecker is now placed in the genus Geocolaptes that was introduced by the English naturalist William Swainson in 1832 to accommodate the ground woodpecker. The generic name Geocolaptes combines the Classical Greek geō meaning "ground" with the genus name Colaptes that had been introduced by the Irish zoologist Nicholas Aylward Vigors in 1825. Colaptes comes from the Ancient Greek kolaptēs meaning "chiseller". The specific epithet olivaceus is the Modern Latin for olive-green. The ground woodpecker in monotypic: no subspecies are recognised.

== Description ==
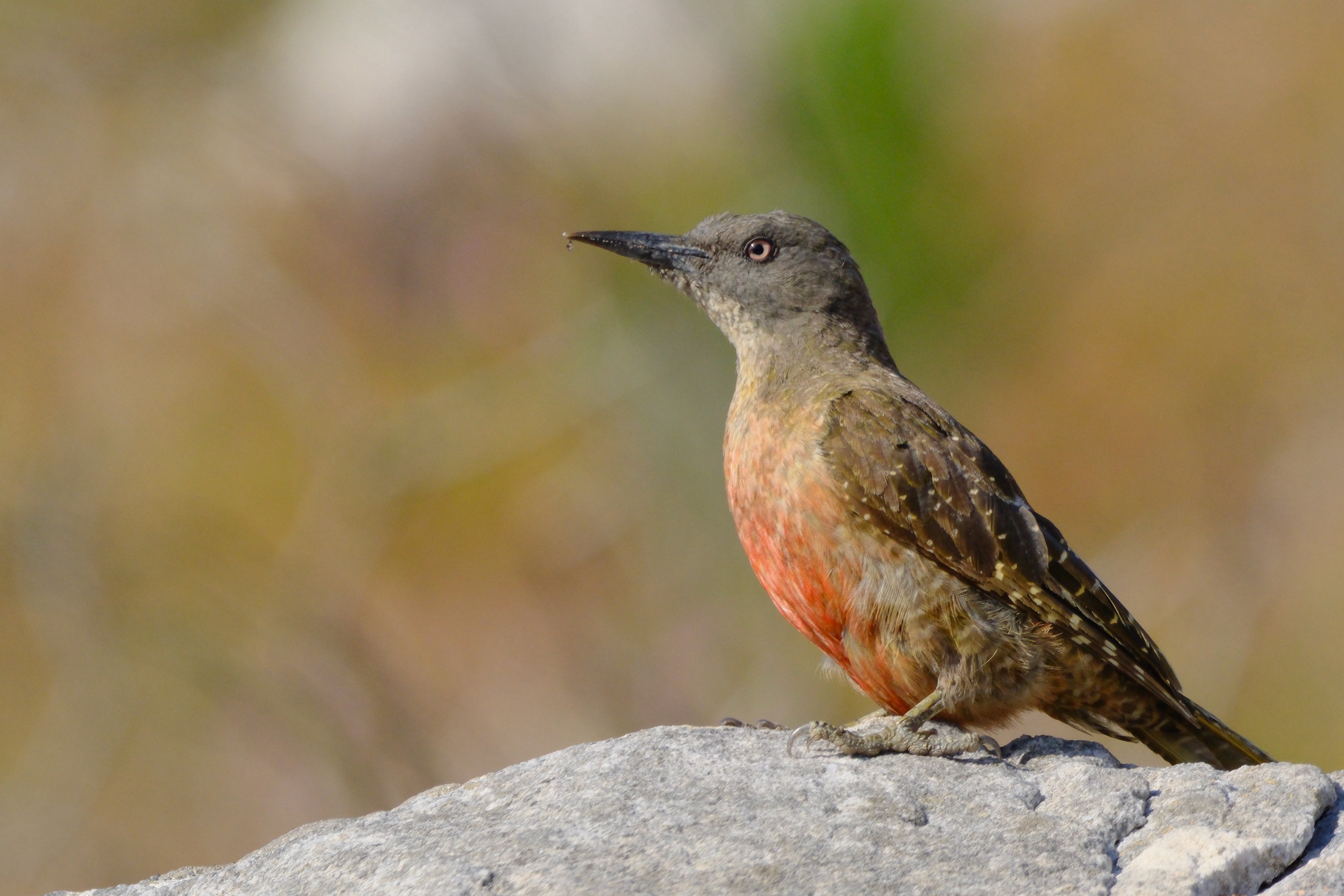
Ground woodpecker, female, Kogelberg Nature Reserve

The ground woodpecker is probably the largest woodpecker in Africa, measuring 22 to 30 cm (8.7 to 11.8 in) in length and weighing around 120 g (4.2 oz) on average. The upper parts are greyish-brown with pale spotting, and the rump is red and more visible in flight. The upper sides of wings and tail are brown barred with white. The underparts are buff, flushed with pink or red. The underside of the tail is pale brown, barred with paler colour. The beak is black, long and slender, the irises pink or yellow and the legs grey. Males and females are broadly similar, but the female has slightly less red and pink than the male. The juvenile is similar to the female.

== Behaviour and ecology ==
It usually lives in pairs or small parties and is best located by its loud, raucous two-note call (chik-ree, chik-ree) with head-swinging. It often peers over or around rocks at intruders.

The diet of the ground woodpecker consists mainly of ants with their eggs, larvae and pupae. These are extracted from dead wood or between rocks, using its long, sticky tongue. It also feeds on the ground, flicking away dead leaves in a manner reminiscent of flickers. Unusually for a woodpecker, one bird does sentry duty from a high point, looking for aerial predators, and this bird is relieved every 10 minutes or so by another member of the group.

It breeds in spring and early summer (August to November), nesting is in a tunnel excavated in the vertical bank of a stream or watercourse. Usually three glossy white eggs are laid in a chamber at the end of the tunnel.

== Gallery ==
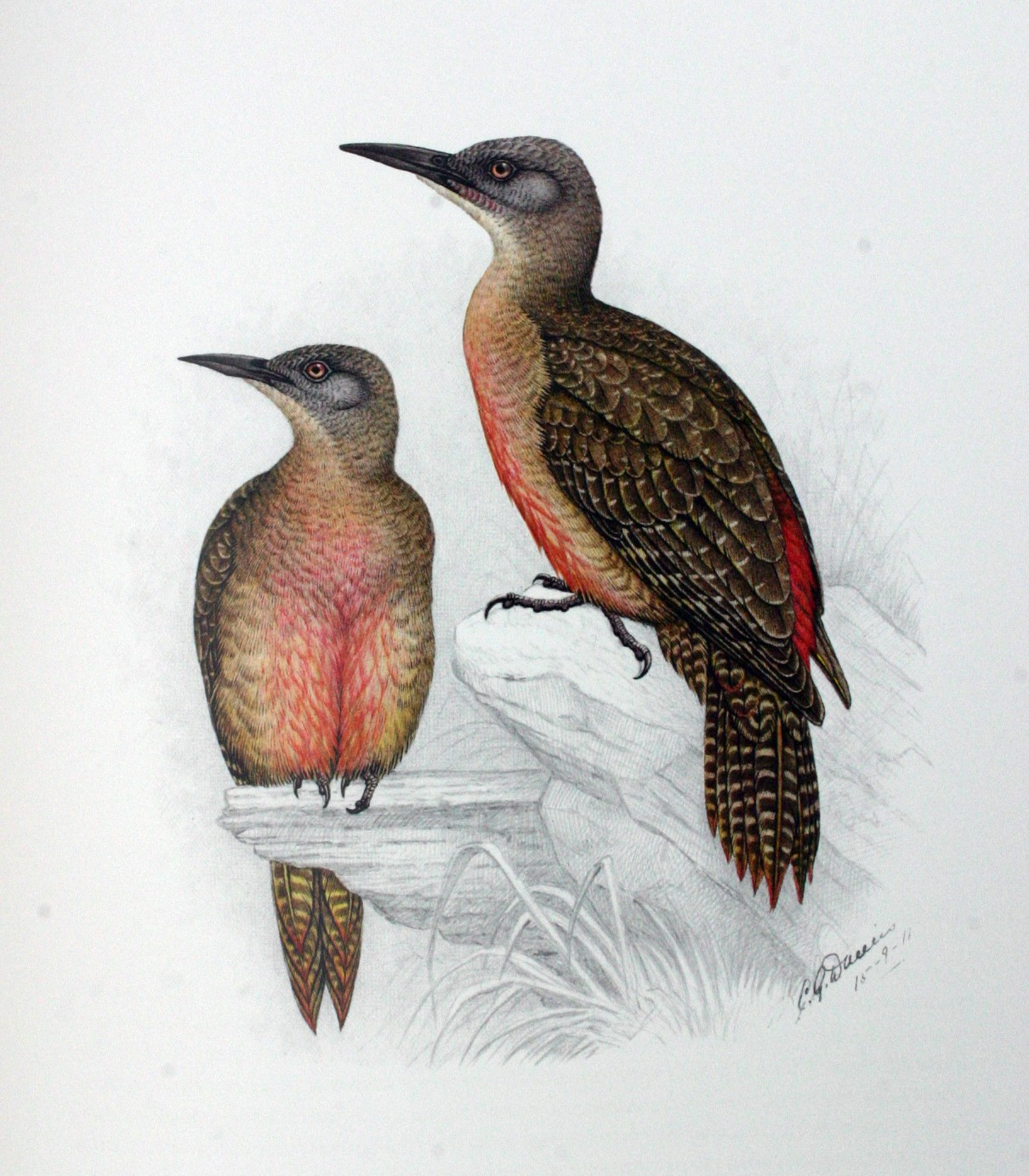
A pair illustrated by C. G. Finch-Davies (1875–1920)

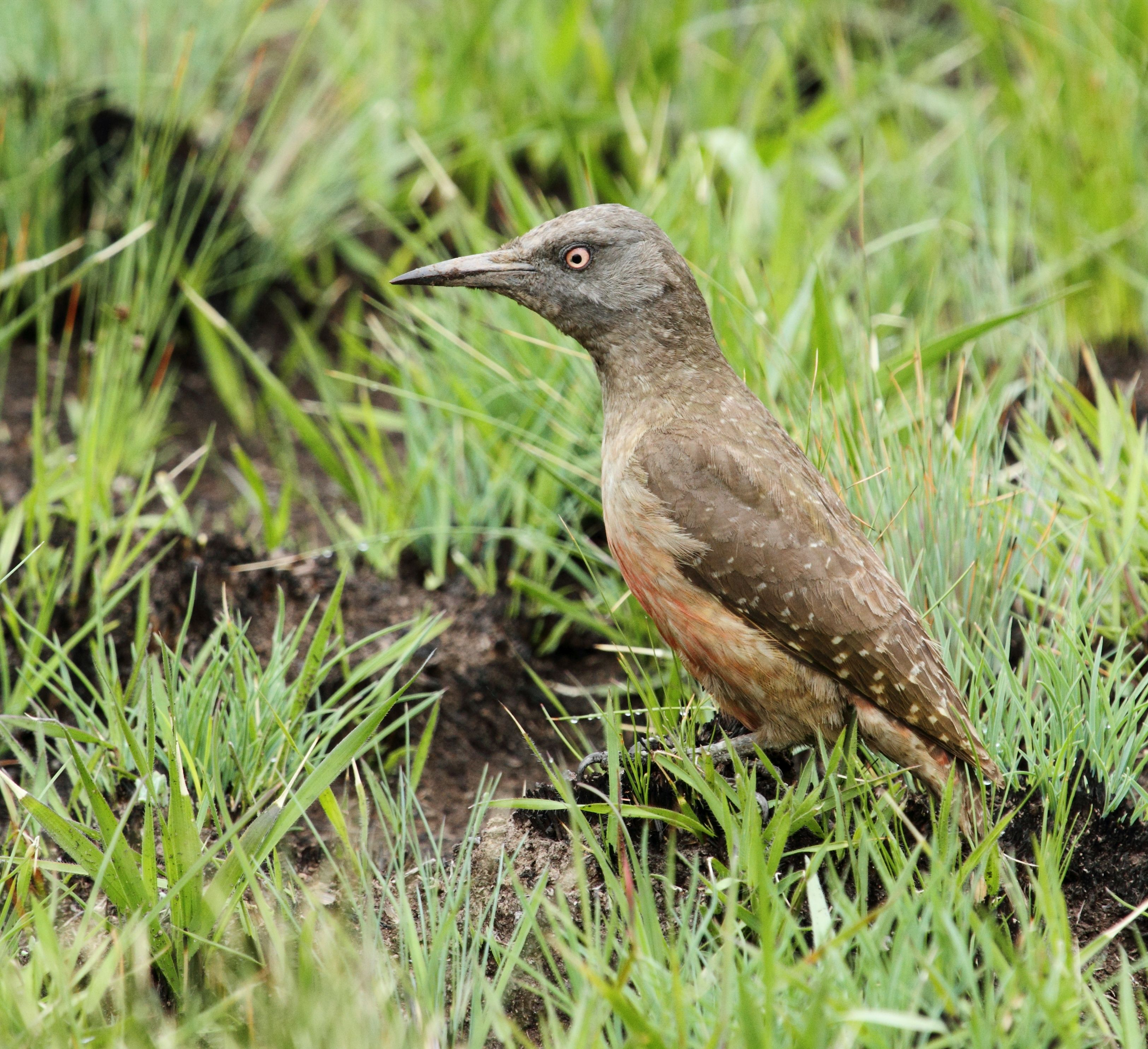
Foraging in grassland

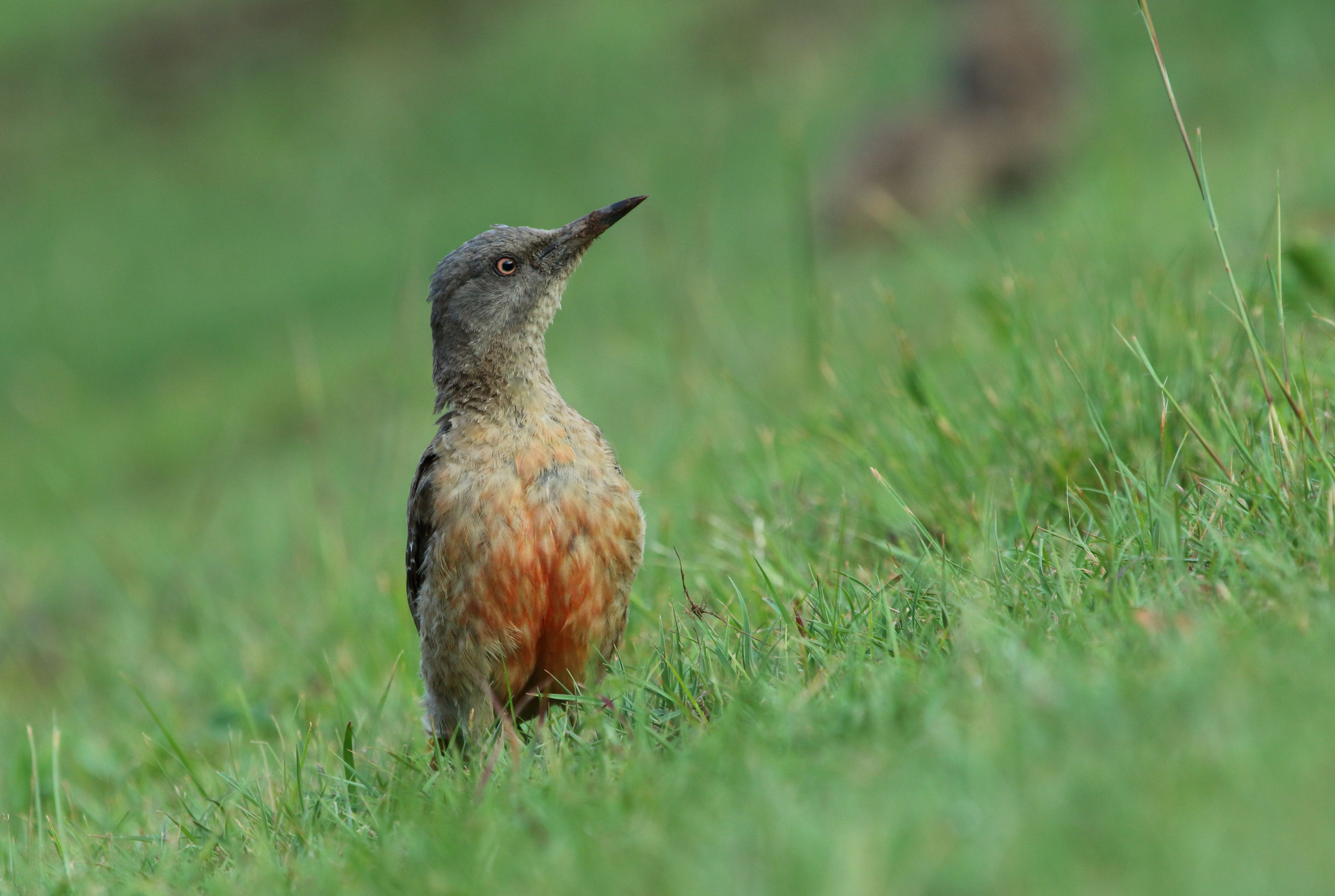

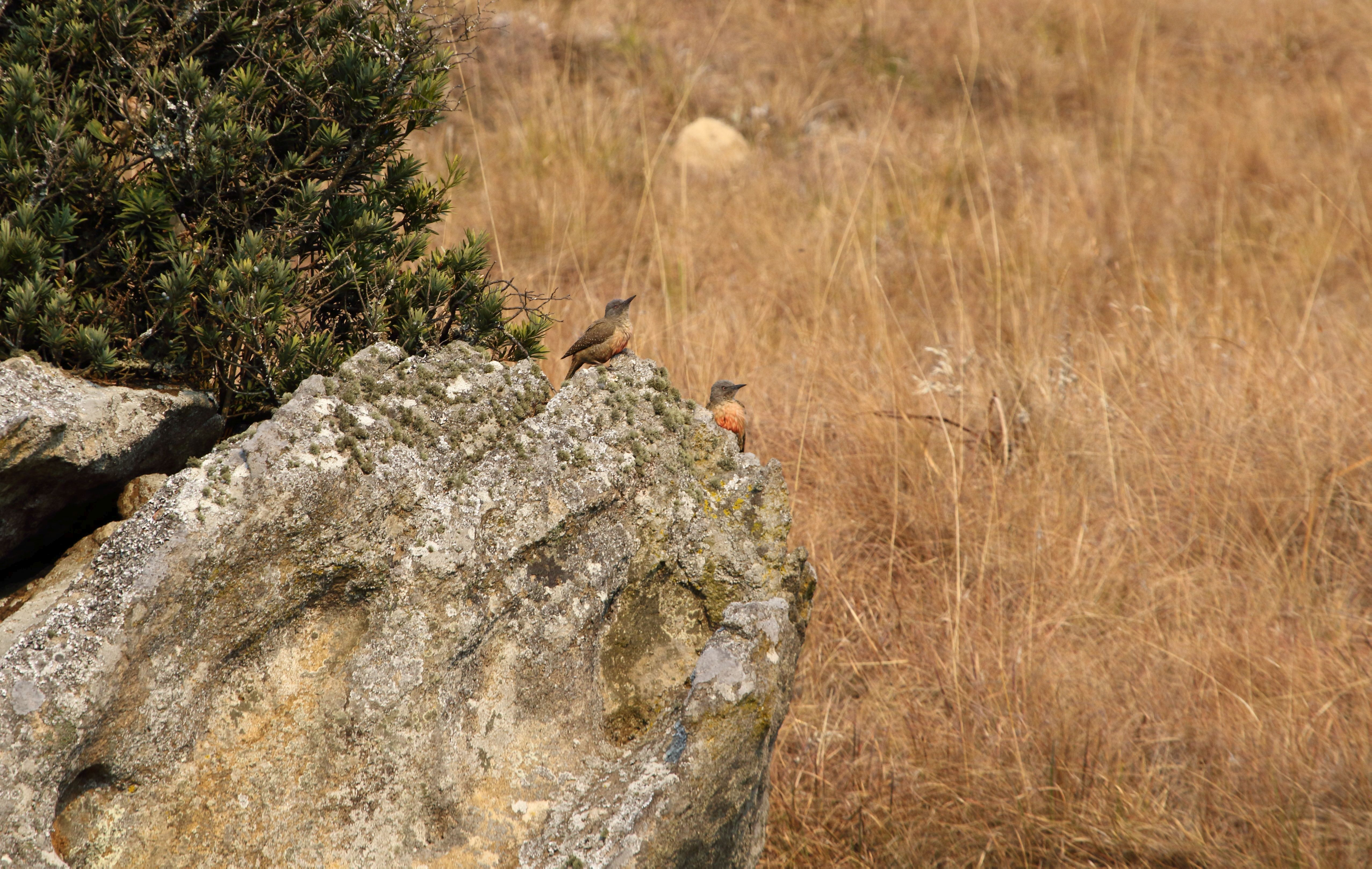
Pair perched on a sandstone prominence
