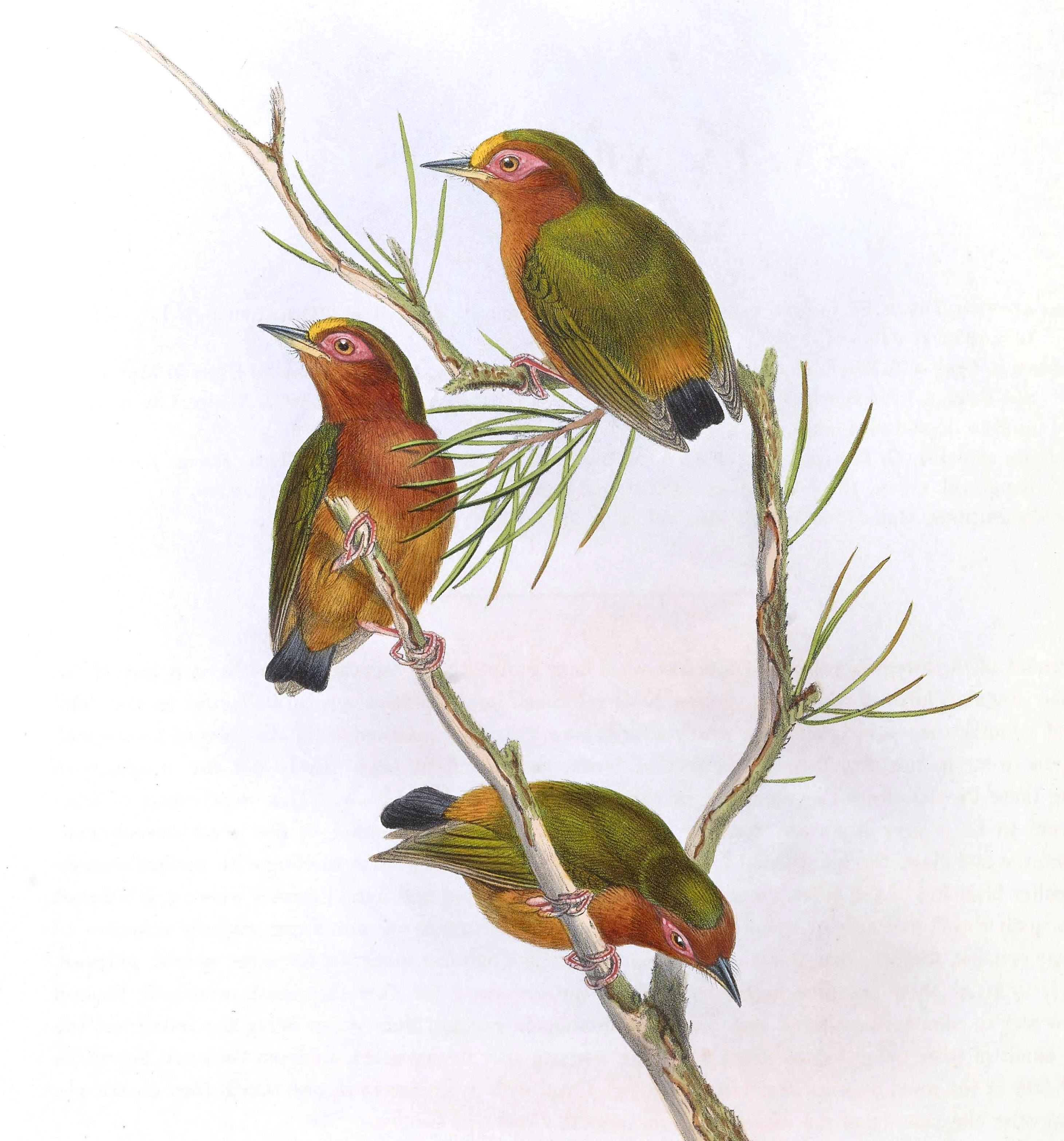
- Sasia abnormis by Gould & Richter

Scientific classification
- Kingdom: Animalia
- Phylum: Chordata
- Class: Aves
- Order: Piciformes
- Family: Picidae
- Subfamily: Picumninae
- Genus: Sasia; Hodgson, 1837

Type species
- Sasia ochracea Hodgson, 1837

Species
- 3, see text
- range of genus

= Sasia =

Genus of birds

Sasia is a genus of birds in the woodpecker family Picidae, that are native to the Old World. They are very small, virtually tailless woodpeckers, with a crombec or nuthatch-like appearance and foraging habits. Their habitat is forest and secondary growth.

These species have a flesh orbital ring and a rounded (in cross-section) upper mandible. They have ten rectrices and only three toes (absent first digit, or hallux).

The African piculet has sometimes been included in this genus. It has only eight rectrices and four toes in a zygodactyl arrangement (a weak first digit). It differs from the Asian species in the plumage colour of the adult, but not in the plumage pattern, body anatomy or in habits.

== Species ==
The genus contains two species:

Image	Common name	Scientific name	Distribution
	Rufous piculet	Sasia abnormis	mainly Malaysia and Indonesia
	White-browed piculet	Sasia ochracea	mainland Southeast Asia

== Gallery ==
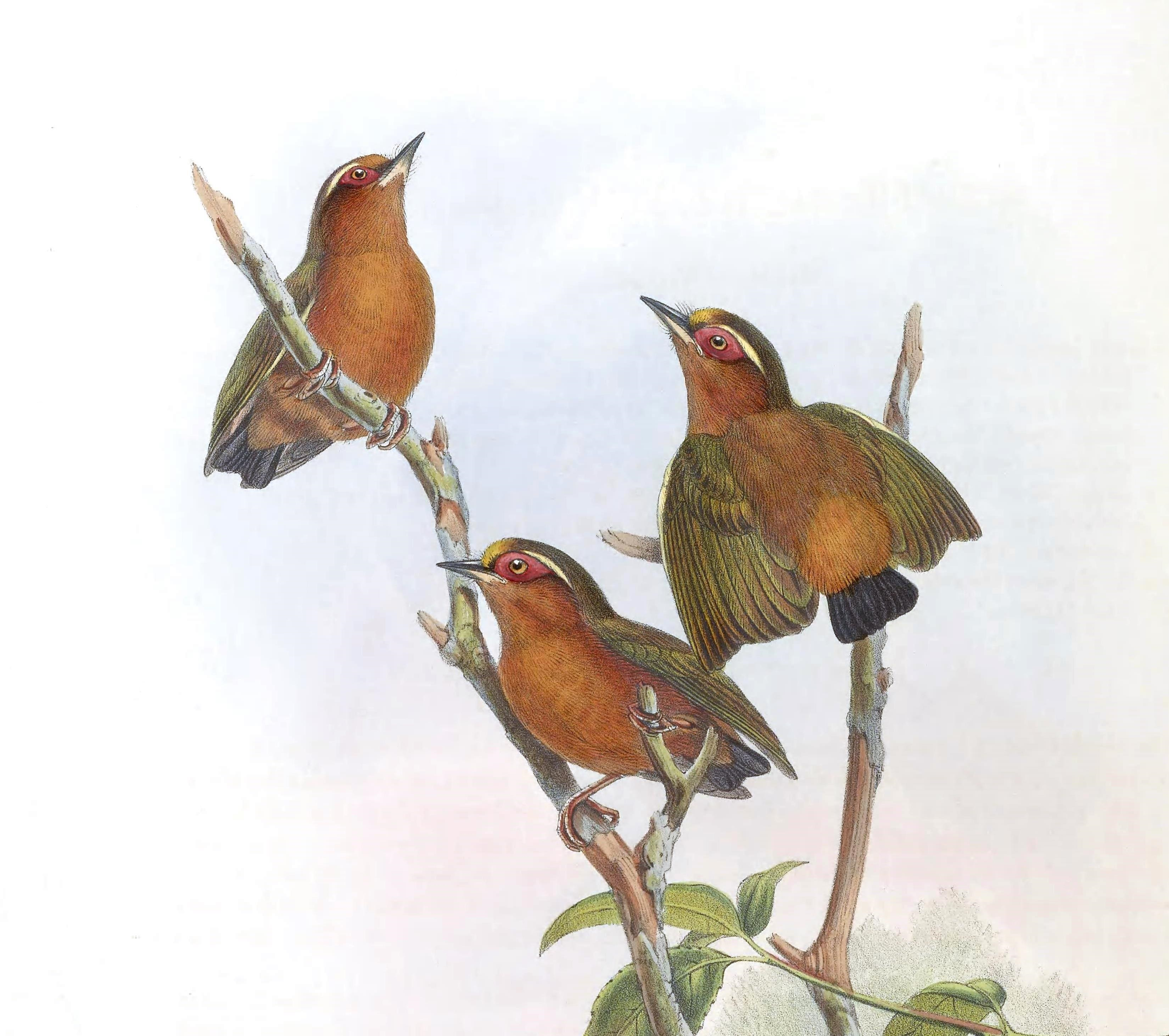
Sasia ochracea
by Gould & Richter

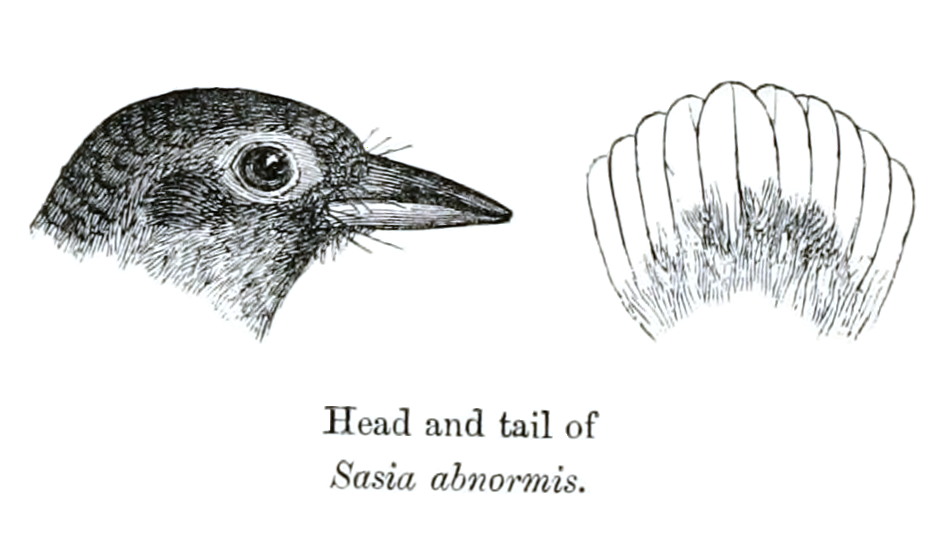
Close-up of the head
and tail of S. abnormis
