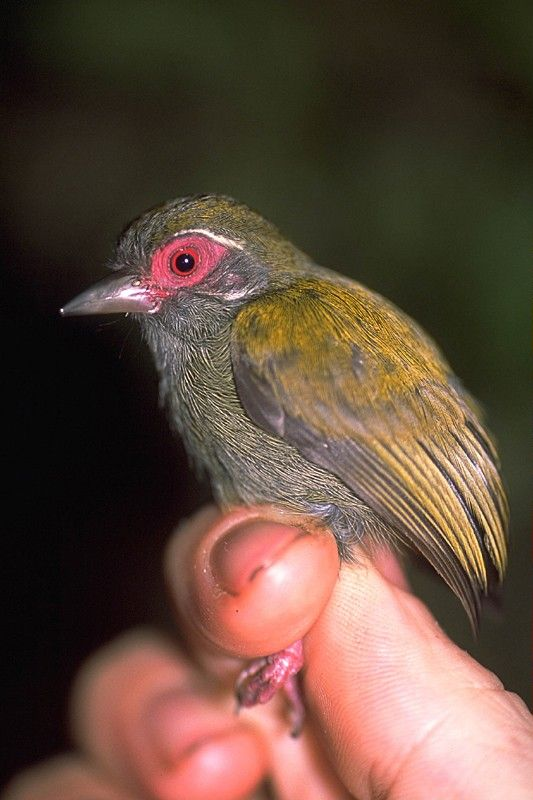

Conservation status
- Least Concern (IUCN 3.1)

Scientific classification
- Kingdom: Animalia
- Phylum: Chordata
- Class: Aves
- Order: Piciformes
- Family: Picidae
- Subfamily: Sasiinae
- Genus: Verreauxia; Hartlaub, 1856
- Species: V. africana

Binomial name
- Verreauxia africana (Verreaux, J & Verreaux, É, 1855)

Synonyms
- Sasia africana (protonym)

= African piculet =

Species of bird

The African piculet (Verreauxia africana), sometimes placed in the genus Sasia, is a species of bird in the family Picidae. It is the only species placed in the genus Verreauxia. It is found in Angola, Cameroon, Central African Republic, Republic of the Congo, Democratic Republic of the Congo, Ivory Coast, Equatorial Guinea, Gabon, Ghana, Liberia, and Uganda. This species is described as locally common and has a very large range, so the International Union for Conservation of Nature has rated its conservation status as being of "least concern".

== Taxonomy ==
The African piculet was formally described in 1855 by the French naturalists Jules and Édouard Verreaux from a specimen collected in Gabon, West Africa. They placed it in the genus Sasia and coined the binomial name Sasia africana. The African piculet is now the only species placed in the genus Verreauxia that was introduced in 1856 by the German ornithologist Gustav Hartlaub. The species is monotypic: no subspecies are recognised.

== Description ==
The African piculet is a small bird some 9 to 10 cm (3.5 to 3.9 in) long. The male has a chestnut or reddish forehead and a greyish-green or olive-green crown whereas the forehead in the female is the same colour as the crown. The rest of the upper parts are rather dark green tinged with yellow. The wings and tail are brownish-black. The throat and breast are darkish grey and the belly is a slightly paler grey. The beak is black, the eye red and the legs reddish. The juvenile is similar to the adult but has grey or buffy tones mixed into the general hue of the plumage.

== Ecology ==
The habitat of the African piculet is mainly lowland secondary forest. It is an active bird often seen flitting from place to place in pairs or threesomes, and sometimes joining mixed species flocks. It forages through the lower storeys of trees, bushes and dense vegetation. It is a relative of the woodpecker, and despite its small size, hammers its beak into branches and splits stems to get at beetle larvae. It also gleans other insects but seems uninterested in ants. Breeding has been observed between June and February in various parts of its range. The nest is built within 5 metres (16 ft) of the ground and the clutch size is usually two. Both parents are involved in raising the young.
