= Bathoceleus hyphalus =

Bathoceleus Temporal range: Pliocene

Scientific classification
- Kingdom: Animalia
- Phylum: Chordata
- Class: Aves
- Order: Piciformes
- Family: Picidae
- Genus: †Bathoceleus
- Species: †B. hyphalus

Binomial name
- †Bathoceleus hyphalus Brodkorb, 1959

Extinct species of bird

Bathoceleus hyphalus is an extinct bird discovered in the Bahamas. It is believed to be a primitive woodpecker.
