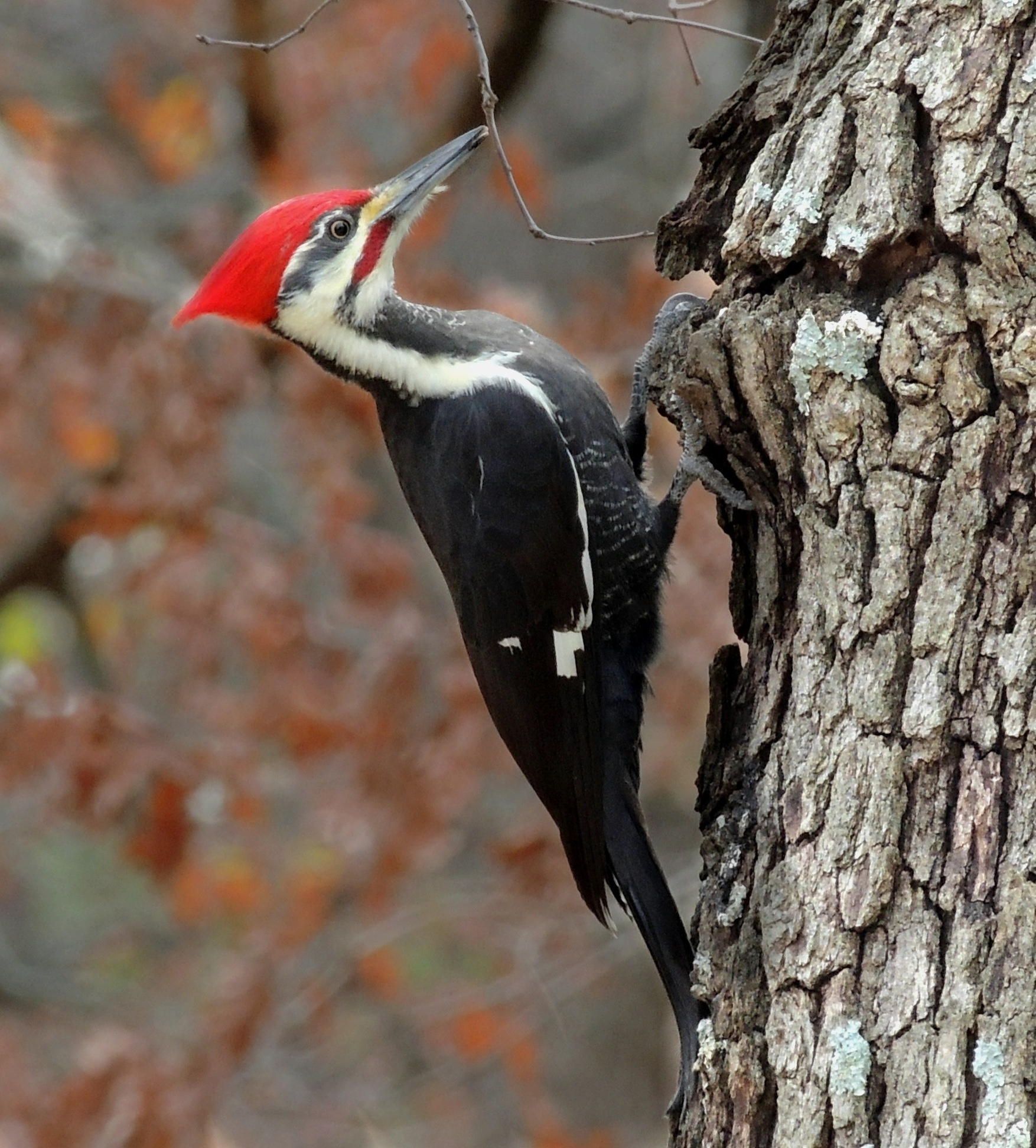
- Pileated woodpecker Tapping sound of a woodpecker

Scientific classification
- Kingdom: Animalia
- Phylum: Chordata
- Class: Aves
- Order: Piciformes
- Suborder: Pici
- Infraorder: Picides
- Family: Picidae; Leach, 1819

Type genus
- Picus Linnaeus, 1758

Subfamilies
- Jynginae – wrynecks; Picinae – true woodpeckers; Picumninae – piculets; Sasiinae - piculets

= Woodpecker =

Woodpecker Temporal range: 26–0 Ma Late Oligocene to present

Family of birds

Woodpeckers are part of the bird family Picidae, which also includes the piculets, wrynecks, and sapsuckers. Members of this family are found worldwide, except for Australia, New Guinea, New Zealand, Madagascar, and the extreme polar regions. Most species live in forests or woodland habitats, although a few species are known that live in treeless areas, such as rocky hillsides and deserts, and the Gila woodpecker specializes in exploiting cacti.

Members of this family are chiefly known for the characteristic behaviour that lent them their common name. Their pecking serves mostly to aid their forage for insect prey in the trunks and branches of trees, and also communication, which they achieve by drumming trees with their beaks, producing a reverberatory sound that can be heard at some distance. Some species vary their diet with fruits, birds' eggs, small animals, tree sap, human scraps, and carrion. They usually nest and roost in holes that they excavate in tree trunks, and their abandoned holes are of importance to other cavity-nesting birds. They sometimes come into conflict with humans when they make holes in buildings or feed on fruit crops, but perform a useful service by their removal of insect pests on trees.

The Picidae are one of nine living families in the order Piciformes, the others being barbets (comprising three families), toucans, toucan-barbets, and honeyguides, which (along with woodpeckers) comprise the clade Pici, and the jacamars and puffbirds in the clade Galbuli. DNA sequencing has confirmed the sister relationships of these two groups. The family Picidae includes about 240 species arranged in 35 genera. Almost 20 species are threatened with extinction due to loss of habitat or habitat fragmentation. One species, the Bermuda flicker, is believed to have gone extinct in the 17th century, while two others (the ivory-billed woodpecker and the imperial woodpecker) are generally considered to be extinct, though that status is not universally accepted; the IUCN lists both as critically endangered as of April 2026.

== General characteristics ==
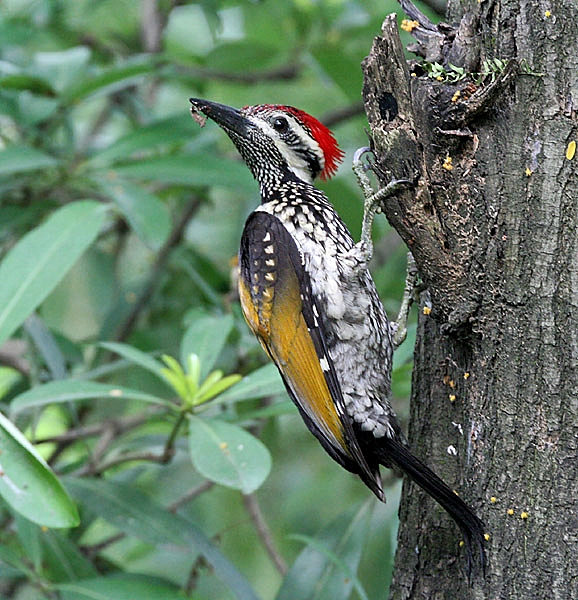
A black-rumped flameback using its tail for support

Woodpeckers include the tiny piculets, the smallest of which appears to be the bar-breasted piculet at 7.5 cm (3.0 in) in length and a weight of 8.9 g (0.31 oz). Some of the largest woodpeckers can be more than 50 cm (20 in) in length. The largest extant species is the great slaty woodpecker, which weighs 430 g (15 oz) on average and up to 563 g (19.9 oz), and measures 45 to 55 cm (18 to 22 in). The imperial woodpecker, at 55 to 61 cm (22 to 24 in), and ivory-billed woodpecker, around 48 to 53 cm (19 to 21 in) and 516 g (18.2 oz), would both be larger, though both species are generally considered to have gone extinct in the 20th century.

The plumage of woodpeckers varies from drab to conspicuous. The colours of many species are based on olive and brown and some are pied, suggesting a need for camouflage; others are boldly patterned in black, white, and red, and many have a crest or tufted feathers on their crowns. Woodpeckers tend to be sexually dimorphic, but differences between the sexes are generally small; exceptions to this are Williamson's sapsucker and the orange-backed woodpecker, which differ markedly. The plumage is moulted fully once a year apart from the wrynecks, which have an additional partial moult before breeding.

Woodpeckers, piculets, and wrynecks all possess characteristic zygodactyl feet, consisting of four toes, the first (hallux) and the fourth facing backward and the second and third facing forward. This foot arrangement is good for grasping the limbs and trunks of trees. Members of this family can walk vertically up tree trunks, which is beneficial for activities such as foraging for food or nest excavation. In addition to their strong claws and feet, woodpeckers have short, strong legs. This is typical of birds that regularly forage on trunks. Exceptions are the black-backed woodpecker and the American and Eurasian three-toed woodpeckers, which have only three toes on each foot. The tails of all woodpeckers, except the piculets and wrynecks, are stiffened, and when the bird perches on a vertical surface, the tail and feet work together to support it.

Woodpeckers have strong bills that they use for drilling and drumming on trees, and long, sticky tongues for extracting food (insects and larvae). Woodpecker bills are typically longer, sharper, and stronger than the bills of piculets and wrynecks, but their morphology is very similar. The bill's chisel-like tip is kept sharp by the pecking action in birds that regularly use it on wood. The beak consists of three layers; an outer sheath called rhamphotheca, made of scales formed from keratin proteins, an inner layer of bone which has a large cavity and mineralised collagen fibers, and a middle layer made of porous bone which connects the two other layers.

Furthermore, the tongue bone (or hyoid bone) of the woodpecker is very long, and winds around outside the skull through a special cavity, thereby cushioning the brain. Combined, this anatomy helps the beak absorb mechanical stress. Species of woodpecker and flicker that use their bills in soil or for probing as opposed to regular hammering tend to have longer and more decurved bills. Due to their smaller bill size, many piculets and wrynecks forage in decaying wood more often than woodpeckers. Their long, sticky tongues, which possess barbs, aid these birds in grabbing and extracting insects from deep within a hole in a tree. The tongue was reported to be used to spear grubs, but more detailed studies published in 2004 have shown that the tongue instead wraps around the prey before being pulled out.

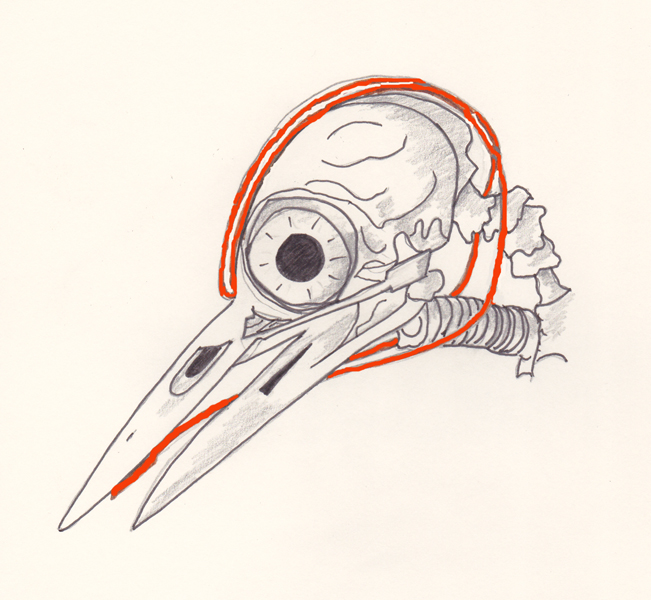
Diagram showing the hyoid bone of Dendrocopos major

Many of the foraging, breeding, and signaling behaviors of woodpeckers involve drumming and hammering using their bills. To prevent brain damage from the rapid and repeated powerful impacts, woodpeckers have a number of physical features that protect their brains. These include a relatively small and smooth brain, narrow subdural space, little cerebrospinal fluid surrounding it to prevent it from moving back and forth inside the skull during pecking, the orientation of the brain within the skull (which maximises the contact area between the brain and the skull) and the short duration of contact. The skull consists of strong but compressible, sponge-like bone, which is most concentrated in the forehead and the back of the skull. Another anatomical adaptation of woodpeckers is the enormously elongated hyoid bone which subdivides, passes on either side of the spinal column and wraps around the brain case, before ending in the right nostril cavity. It plays the role of safety-belt.

Computer simulations have shown that 99.7% of the energy generated in pecking is stored in the form of strain energy, which is distributed throughout the bird's body, with only a small remaining fraction of the energy going into the brain. The pecking also causes the woodpecker's skull to heat up, which is part of the reason why they often peck in short bursts with brief breaks in between, giving the head some time to cool. During the millisecond before contact with wood, a thickened nictitating membrane closes, protecting the eye from flying debris. These membranes also prevent the retina from tearing. Their nostrils are also protected; they are often slit-like and have special feathers to cover them. Woodpeckers are capable of repeated pecking on a tree at high decelerations on the order of 10,000 m/s^{2} (33,000 ft/s^{2}) (1000 g).

Some large woodpeckers such as Dryocopus have a fast, direct form of flight, but the majority of species have a typical undulating flight pattern consisting of a series of rapid flaps followed by a swooping glide. Many birds in the genus Melanerpes have distinctive, rowing wing strokes, while the piculets engage in short bursts of rapid direct flight.

== Distribution, habitat, and movements ==
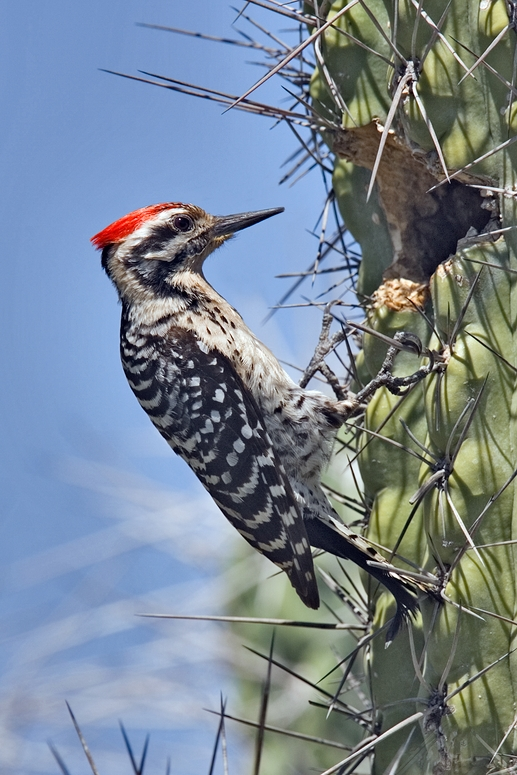
Use of cacti for breeding and roosting holes allows some woodpeckers to live in treeless deserts, such as the ladder-backed woodpecker, which uses cacti for nesting.

=== Global distribution ===
Woodpeckers have a mostly cosmopolitan distribution, although they are absent from Australasia, Madagascar, and Antarctica. They are also absent from some of the world's oceanic islands, although many insular species are found on continental islands. The true woodpeckers, subfamily Picinae, are distributed across the entire range of the family. The Picumninae piculets have a pantropical distribution, with species in Southeast Asia, Africa, and the Neotropics, with the greatest diversity being in South America. The second piculet subfamily, the Sasiinae, contains the African piculet and two species in the genus Sasia that are found in Southeast Asia. The wrynecks (Jynginae) are found exclusively in the Old World, with the two species occurring in Europe, Asia, and Africa.

Most woodpeckers are sedentary, but a few examples of migratory species are known, such as the rufous-bellied woodpecker, yellow-bellied sapsucker, and Eurasian wryneck, which breeds in Europe and west Asia and migrates to the Sahel in Africa in the winter. More northerly populations of Lewis's woodpecker, northern flicker, Williamson's sapsucker, red-breasted sapsucker, and red-naped sapsucker all move southwards in the fall in North America. Most woodpecker movements can be described as dispersive, such as when young birds seek territories after fledging, or eruptive, to escape harsh weather conditions. Several species are altitudinal migrants, for example the grey-capped pygmy woodpecker, which moves to lowlands from hills during winter. The woodpeckers that do migrate, do so during the day.

=== Habitat requirements ===
Overall, woodpeckers are arboreal birds of wooded habitats. They reach their greatest diversity in tropical rainforests, but occur in almost all suitable habitats, including woodlands, savannahs, scrublands, and bamboo forests. Even grasslands and deserts have been colonised by various species. These habitats are more easily occupied where a small number of trees exist, or in the case of desert species like the Gila woodpecker, tall cacti are available for nesting. Some are specialists and are associated with coniferous or deciduous woodlands, or even, like the acorn woodpecker, with individual tree genera (oaks in this case). Other species are generalists and are able to adapt to forest clearance by exploiting secondary growth, plantations, orchards, and parks. In general, forest-dwelling species need rotting or dead wood on which to forage.

Several species are adapted to spending a portion of their time feeding on the ground, and a very small minority have abandoned trees entirely and nest in holes in the ground. The ground woodpecker is one such species, inhabiting the rocky and grassy hills of South Africa, and the Andean flicker is another.

The Swiss Ornithological Institute has set up a monitoring program to record breeding populations of woodland birds. This has shown that deadwood is an important habitat requirement for the black woodpecker, great spotted woodpecker, middle spotted woodpecker, lesser spotted woodpecker, European green woodpecker, and Eurasian three-toed woodpecker. Populations of all these species increased by varying amounts from 1990 to 2008. During this period, the amount of deadwood in the forest increased and the range of the white-backed woodpecker enlarged as it extended eastwards. With the exception of the green and middle-spotted woodpeckers, the increase in the amount of deadwood is likely to be the major factor explaining the population increase of these species.

== Behavior ==
Woodpecker
A woodpecker pecking into a tree

Most woodpeckers live solitary lives, but their behavior ranges from highly antisocial species that are aggressive towards their own kind, to species that live in groups. Solitary species defend such feeding resources as a termite colony or fruit-laden tree, driving away other conspecifics and returning frequently until the resource is exhausted. Aggressive behaviors include bill pointing and jabbing, head shaking, wing flicking, chasing, drumming, and vocalizations. Ritual actions do not usually result in contact, and birds may "freeze" for a while before they resume their dispute. The colored patches may be flouted, and in some instances, these antagonistic behaviors resemble courtship rituals.

Group-living species tend to be communal group breeders. In addition to these species, a number of species may join mixed-species foraging flocks with other insectivorous birds, although they tend to stay at the edges of these groups. Joining these flocks allows woodpeckers to decrease their anti-predator vigilance and increase their feeding rate. Woodpeckers are diurnal, roosting at night inside holes and crevices. In many species the roost will become the nest-site during the breeding season, but in some species they have separate functions; the grey-and-buff woodpecker makes several shallow holes for roosting which are quite distinct from its nesting site. Most birds roost alone and will oust intruders from their chosen site, but the Magellanic woodpecker and acorn woodpecker are cooperative roosters.

=== Drumming ===
The sound of a woodpecker (Picidae) tapping, with a few background sounds as well. Species/location unknown, presumably from the continental United States.

Drumming is a form of nonvocal communication used by most species of woodpeckers, and involves the bill being repeatedly struck on a hard surface with great rapidity. After a pause, the drum roll is repeated, with each species having a pattern that is unique in the number of beats in the roll, the length of the roll, the length of the gap between rolls, and the cadence. The drumming is mainly a territorial call, equivalent to the song of a passerine. Woodpeckers choose a surface that resonates, such as a hollow tree, and may use man-made structures such as gutters and downpipes. Drumming serves for the mutual recognition of conspecifics and plays a part in courtship rituals. Individual birds are thought to be able to distinguish the drumming of their mates and those of their neighbors. Drumming can be reliably used to distinguish between multiple species in a region, even if those species are phenotypically similar. Cadence (or the mean number of drum beats per second) is heavily conserved within species. Comparative analyses within species between distant geographic populations have shown that cadence is heavily conserved across species' respective ranges, indicating that there likely are not 'dialects' as seen in passerine song. Drumming in woodpeckers is controlled by a set of nuclei in the forebrain that closely resemble the brain regions that underlie song learning and production in many songbirds. A 2023 study revealed a strong association between extractive foraging and relative brain size across the Family Picidae, indicating that a larger brain does not necessarily result in more powerful drumming abilities, but is implicated in foraging behaviors, as the act of sensing and retrieving wood-boring larvae from woody substrates likely requires an increase in sensory and motor control capabilities.

=== Calls ===
Woodpeckers do not have such a wide range of songs and calls as do passerine birds, and the sounds they make tend to be simpler in structure. Calls produced include brief, high-pitched notes, trills, rattles, twittering, whistling, chattering, nasal churrs, screams, and wails. These calls are used by both sexes in communication and are related to the circumstances of the occasion; these include courtship, territorial disputes, and alarm calls. Each species has its own range of calls, which tend to be in the 1.0 to 2.5 kHz range for efficient transmission through forested environments. Mated couples may exchange muted, low-pitched calls, and nestlings often issue noisy begging calls from inside their nest cavity. The wrynecks have a more musical song, and in some areas, the song of the newly arrived Eurasian wryneck is considered to be the harbinger of spring. The piculets either have a song consisting of a long, descending trill, or a descending series of two to six (sometimes more) individual notes, and this song alerts ornithologists to the presence of the birds, as they are easily overlooked.

=== Diet and feeding ===
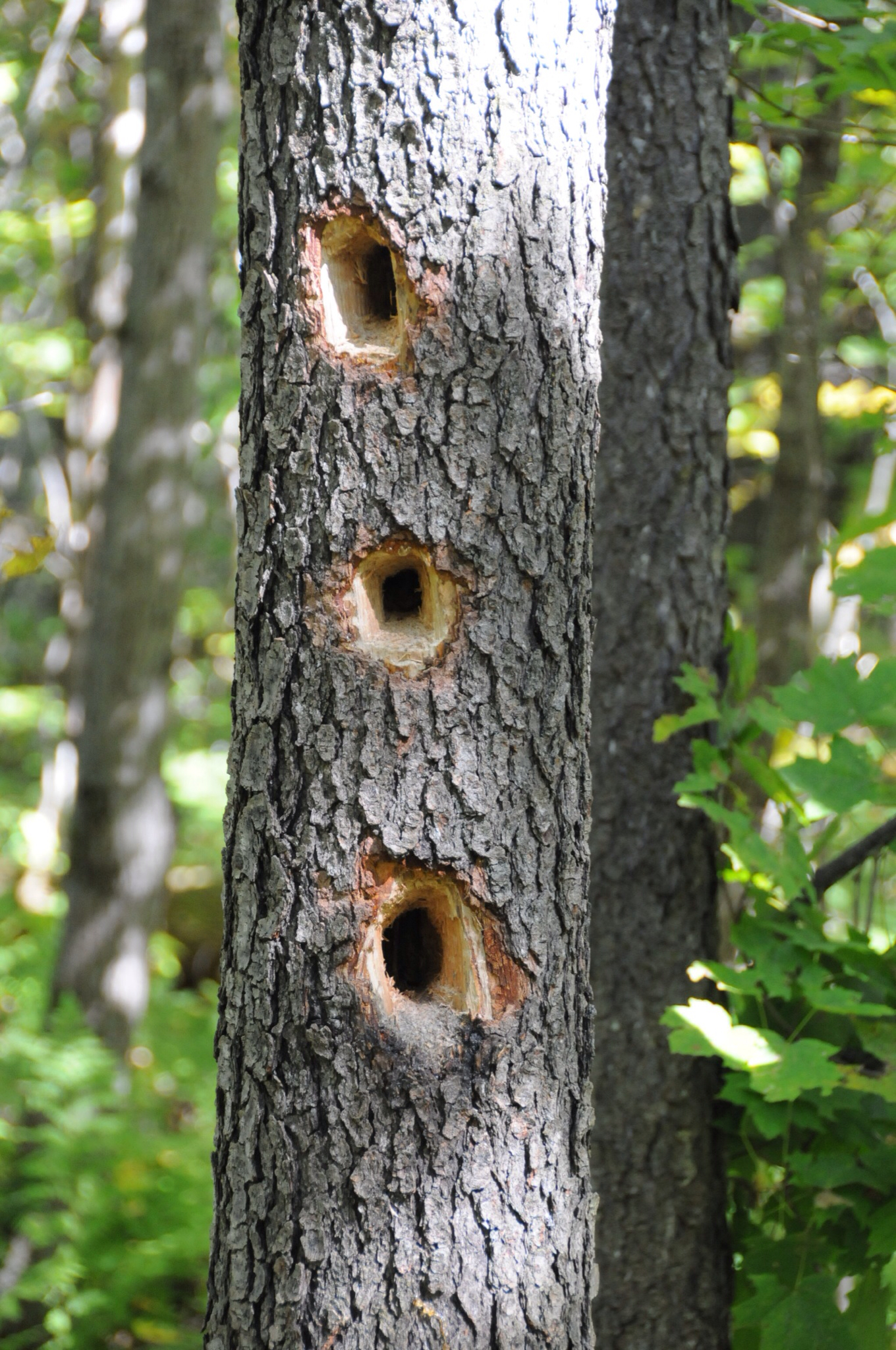
Holes bored by feeding woodpeckers

Most woodpecker species feed on insects and other invertebrates living under bark and in wood, but overall, the family is characterized by its dietary flexibility, with many species being both highly omnivorous and opportunistic. The diet includes ants, termites, beetles and their larvae, caterpillars, spiders, other arthropods, bird eggs, nestlings, small rodents, lizards, fruit, nuts, and sap. Many insects and their grubs are taken from living and dead trees by excavation. The bird may hear sounds from inside the timber indicating where creating a hole would be productive. Crustaceans, molluscs, and carrion may be eaten by some species, including the great spotted woodpecker, and bird feeders are visited for suet and domestic scraps.

Other means are also used to garner prey. Some species, such as the red-naped sapsucker, sally into the air to catch flying insects, and many species probe into crevices and under bark, or glean prey from leaves and twigs. The rufous woodpecker specialises in attacking the nests of arboreal ants, and the buff-spotted woodpecker feeds on and nests in termite mounds. Other species, such as the wrynecks and the Andean flicker, feed wholly or partly on the ground.

Ecologically, woodpeckers help to keep trees healthy by keeping them from suffering mass infestations. The family is noted for its ability to acquire wood-boring grubs from the trunks and branches, whether the timber is alive or dead. Having hammered a hole into the wood, the prey is extracted by use of a long, barbed tongue. Woodpeckers consume beetles that burrow into trees, removing as many as 85% of emerald ash borer larvae from individual ash trees.

The ability to excavate allows woodpeckers to obtain tree sap, an important source of food for some species. Most famously, the sapsuckers (genus Sphyrapicus) feed in this fashion, but the technique is not restricted to these, and others such as the acorn woodpecker and white-headed woodpecker also feed on sap. The technique was once thought to be restricted to the New World, but Old World species, such as the Arabian woodpecker and great spotted woodpecker, also feed in this way.

=== Breeding ===
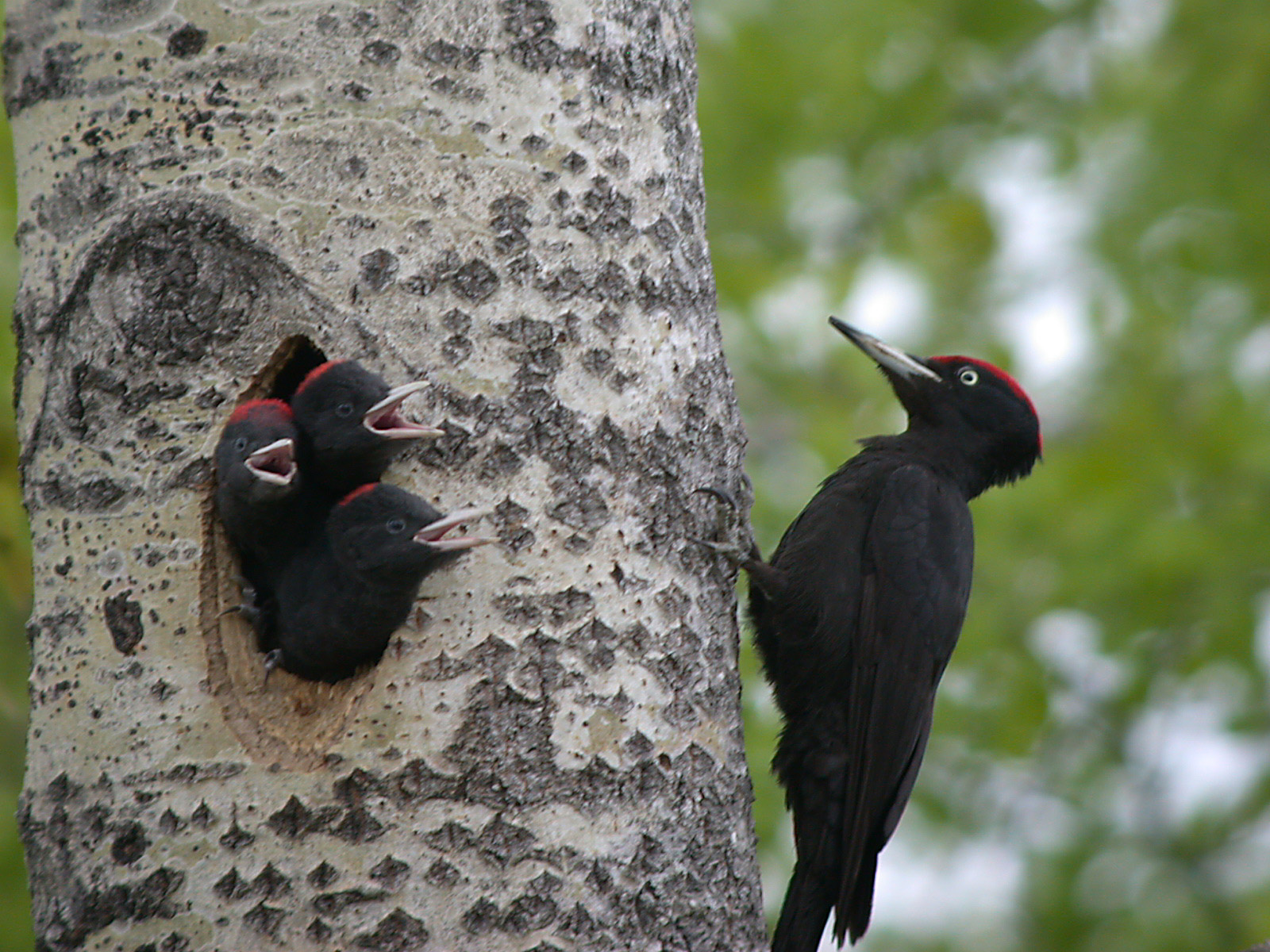
A male black woodpecker attending to its chicks

All members of the family Picidae nest in cavities, nearly always in the trunks and branches of trees, well away from the foliage. Where possible, an area of rotten wood surrounded by sound timber is used. Where trees are in short supply, the gilded flicker and ladder-backed woodpecker excavate holes in cactus, and the Andean flicker and ground woodpecker dig holes in earth banks. The campo flicker sometimes chooses termite mounds, the rufous woodpecker prefers to use ants' nests in trees and the bamboo woodpecker specialises in bamboos. Woodpeckers also excavate nest holes in residential and commercial structures and wooden utility poles.

Woodpeckers and piculets excavate their own nests, but wrynecks do not, and need to find pre-existing cavities. A typical nest has a round entrance hole that just fits the bird, leading to an enlarged vertical chamber below. No nesting material is used, apart from some wood chips produced during the excavation; other wood chips are liberally scattered on the ground, thus providing visual evidence of the site of the nest. Many species of woodpeckers excavate one hole per breeding season, sometimes after multiple attempts. It takes around a month to finish the job and abandoned holes are used by other birds and mammals that are cavity nesters unable to excavate their own holes.

Cavities are in great demand for nesting by other cavity nesters, so woodpeckers face competition for the nesting sites they excavate from the moment the hole becomes usable. This may come from other species of woodpecker, or other cavity-nesting birds such as swallows and starlings. Woodpeckers may aggressively harass potential competitors, and also use other strategies to reduce the chance of being usurped from their nesting sites; for example, the red-crowned woodpecker digs its nest in the underside of a small branch, which reduces the chance that a larger species will take it over and expand it.

Members of Picidae are typically monogamous, with a few species breeding cooperatively and some polygamy reported in a few others. Polyandry, where a female raises two broods with two separate males, has also been reported in the West Indian woodpecker. Another unusual social system is that of the acorn woodpecker, which is a polygynandrous cooperative breeder where groups of up to 12 individuals breed and help to raise the young. Young birds from previous years may stay behind to help raise the group's young, and studies have found reproductive success for the group goes up with group size, but individual success goes down. Birds may be forced to remain in groups due to a lack of habitat to which to disperse.

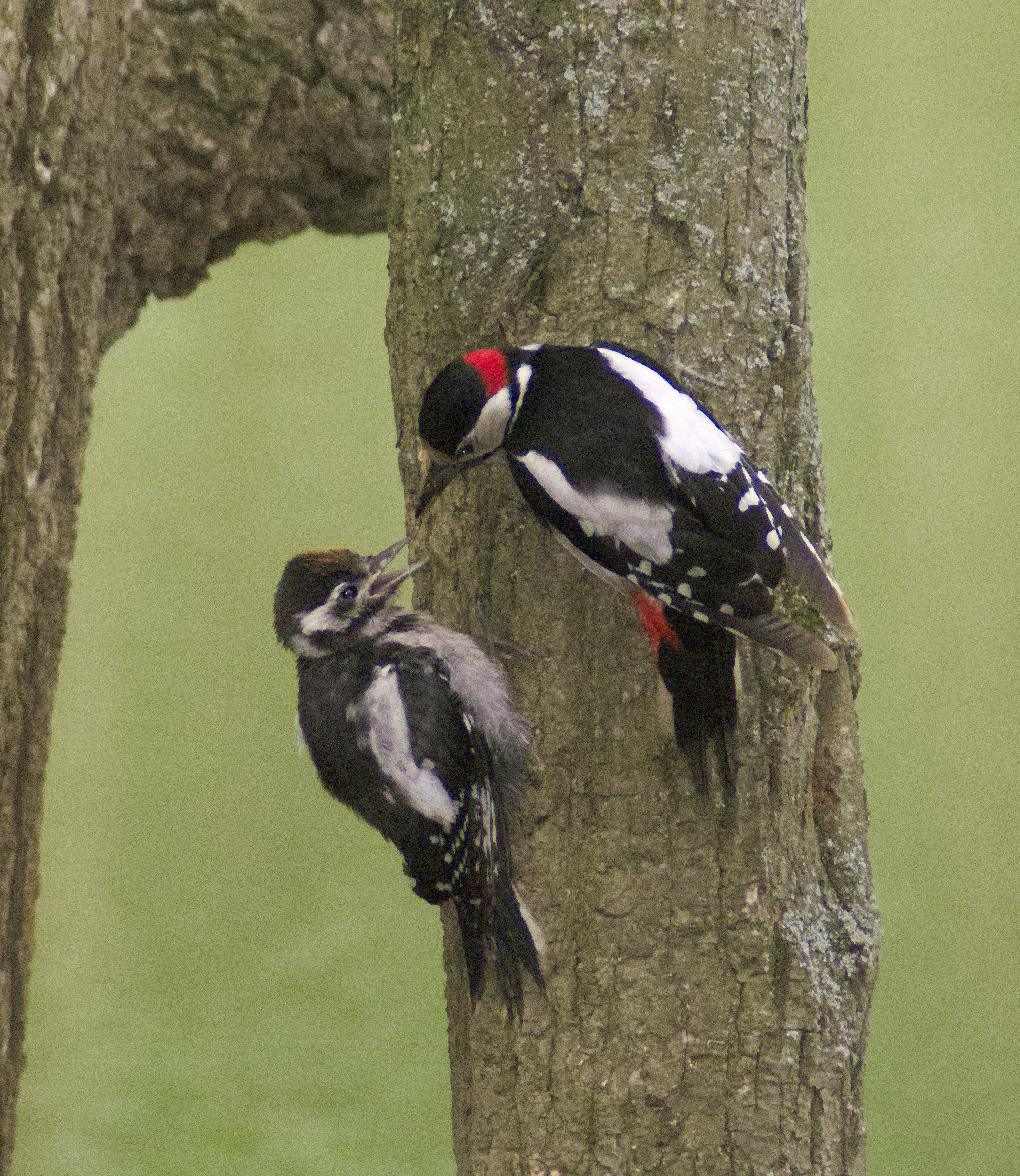
Great spotted woodpecker feeding its chick, Russia

A pair works together to help build the nest, incubate the eggs, and raise their altricial young. In most species, though, the male does most of the nest excavation and takes the night shift while incubating the eggs. A clutch usually consists of two to five round, white eggs. Since these birds are cavity nesters, their eggs do not need to be camouflaged and the white color helps the parents to see them in dim light. The eggs are incubated for about 11–14 days before they hatch. About 18–30 days are then needed before the chicks are fully fledged and ready to leave the nest. In most species, soon after this, the young are left to fend for themselves, exceptions being the various social species, and the Hispaniolan woodpecker, where adults continue to feed their young for several months. In general, cavity nesting is a successful strategy and a higher proportion of young is reared than is the case with birds that nest in the open. In Africa, several species of honeyguide are brood parasites of woodpeckers.

== Systematics and evolutionary history ==
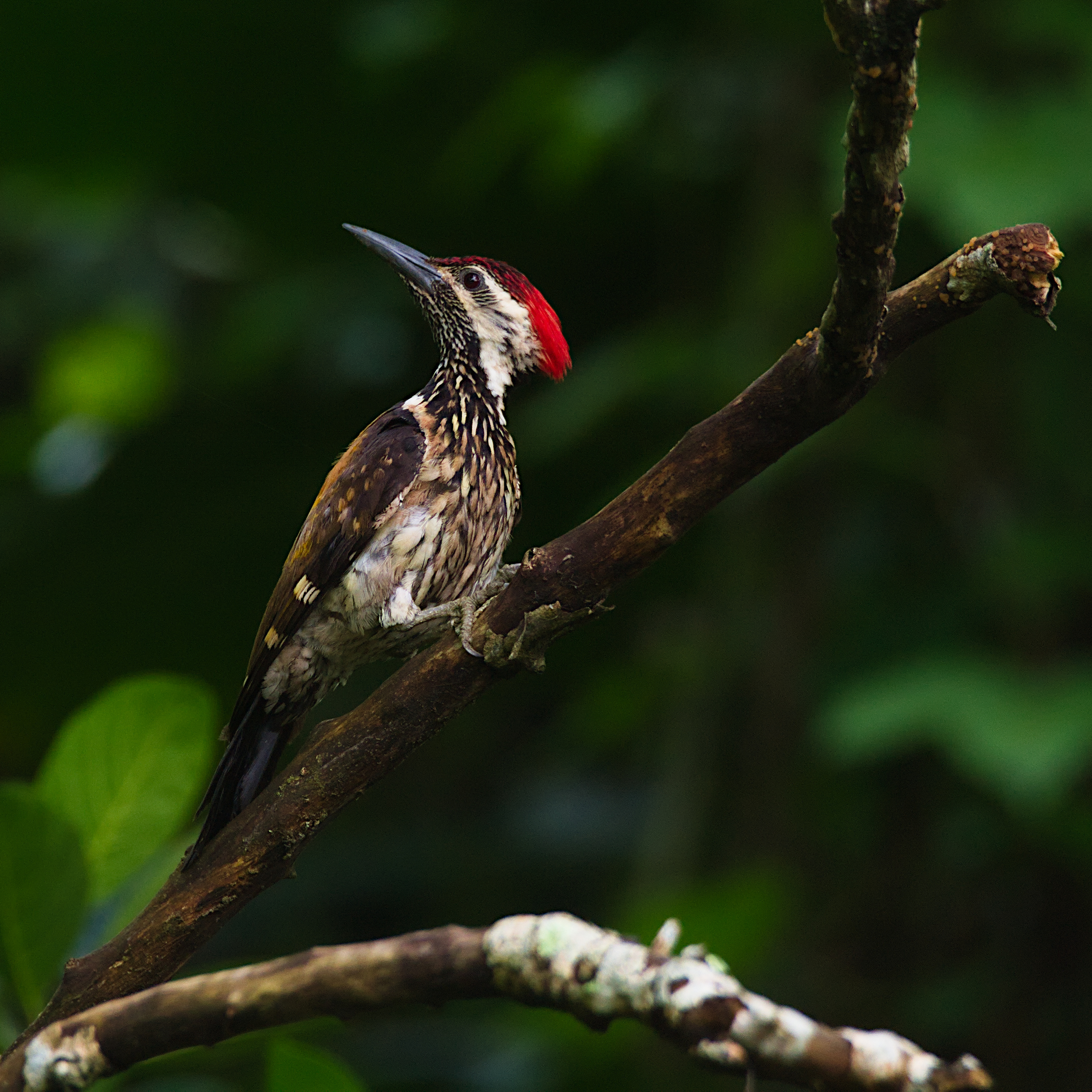
Black-rumped goldenback (Dinopium benghalense) in Guwahati, India

The Picidae are just one of nine living families in the order Piciformes. Other members of this group, such as the jacamars, puffbirds, barbets, toucans, and honeyguides, have traditionally been thought to be closely related to the woodpecker family (true woodpeckers, piculets, wrynecks, and sapsuckers). The clade Pici (woodpeckers, barbets, toucans, and honeyguides) is well supported and shares a zygodactyl foot with the Galbuli (puffbirds and jacamars). More recently, several DNA sequence analyses have confirmed that Pici and Galbuli are sister groups.

The phylogenetic relationship between the woodpeckers and the eight other families in the order Piciformes is shown in the cladogram below. The number of species in each family is taken from taxonomy published by AviList.

- Piciformes
  - - Galbulidae – jacamars (18 species)
    - Bucconidae – puffbirds (37 species)
  - - - Indicatoridae – honeyguides (16 species)
      - Picidae – woodpeckers (237 species)
    - - Megalaimidae – Asian barbets (35 species)
      - - Lybiidae – African barbets (43 species)
        - - Capitonidae – New World barbets (15 species)
          - - Semnornithidae – toucan barbets (2 species)
            - Ramphastidae – toucans (37 species)

The name Picidae for the family was introduced by English zoologist William Elford Leach in a guide to the contents of the British Museum published in 1819. The phylogeny has been updated according to new knowledge about convergence patterns and evolutionary history. Most notably, the relationship of the Picinae genera has been largely clarified, and the Antillean piculet was found to be a surviving offshoot of protowoodpeckers. Genetic analysis supports the monophyly of the Picidae, which seem to have originated in the Old World, but the geographic origins of the Picinae is unclear. The Picumninae are returned as paraphyletic. Morphological and behavioural characters, in addition to DNA evidence, highlights genus Hemicircus as the sister group of all remaining true woodpeckers, besides a sister-group relationship between the true woodpecker tribes Dendropicini and Malarpicini.

The evolutionary history of this group is not well documented, but the known fossils allow some preliminary conclusions; the earliest known modern picids were piculet-like forms of the Late Oligocene, about 25 million years ago (Mya). By that time, however, the group was already present in the Americas and Europe, and they actually may have evolved much earlier, maybe as early as the Early Eocene (50 Mya). The modern subfamilies appear to be rather young by comparison; until the mid-Miocene (10–15 Mya), all picids seem to have been small or mid-sized birds similar to a mixture between a piculet and a wryneck. A feather enclosed in fossil amber from the Dominican Republic, dated to about 25 Mya, however, seems to indicate that the Nesoctitinae were already a distinct lineage by then.

Stepwise adaptations for drilling, tapping, and climbing head first on vertical surfaces have been suggested. The last common ancestor of woodpeckers (Picidae) was incapable of climbing up tree trunks or excavating nest cavities by drilling with its beak. The first adaptations for drilling (including reinforced rhamphotheca, frontal overhang, and processus dorsalis pterygoidei) evolved in the ancestral lineage of piculets and true woodpeckers. Additional adaptations for drilling and tapping (enlarged condylus lateralis of the quadrate and fused lower mandible) have evolved in the ancestral lineage of true woodpeckers (Hemicircus excepting). The inner rectrix pairs became stiffened, and the pygostyle lamina was enlarged in the ancestral lineage of true woodpeckers (Hemicircus included), which facilitated climbing head first up tree limbs. Genus Hemicircus excepting, the tail feathers were further transformed for specialized support, the pygostyle disc became greatly enlarged, and the ectropodactyl toe arrangement evolved. These latter characters may have facilitated enormous increases in body size in some lineages.

Prehistoric representatives of the extant Picidae genera are treated in the genus articles. An enigmatic form based on a coracoid, found in Pliocene deposits of New Providence in the Bahamas, has been described as Bathoceleus hyphalus and probably also is a woodpecker.

The following cladogram is based on the comprehensive molecular phylogenetic study of the woodpeckers published in 2017 together with the list of bird species published by AviList. The Cuban green woodpecker in the monotypic genus Xiphidiopicus was not included in the study. The relative positions of Picumninae, Sasiinae and Picinae in the cladogram are uncertain. In the 2017 study the results depended upon which of two different statistical procedures were used to analyse the DNA sequence data. One method found that Sasiinae was sister to Picinae (as shown below), the other method found that Sasiinae was sister to a clade containing both Picumninae and Picinae.

- Picidae
  - Jynginae
    Jynx – 2 species (wrynecks)
  - - Picumninae
      Picumnus – 25 species (piculets)
    - - Sasiinae
        - Verreauxia – African piculet
        - Sasia – 2 species (piculets)
      - Picinae
        - - Nesoctitini
            Nesoctites – Antillean piculet
          - Hemicirini
            Hemicircus – 2 species
        - - Picini
            - - - Micropternus – rufous woodpecker
                - Meiglyptes – 4 species
              - - Gecinulus – 3 species
                - Dinopium – 5 species (flamebacks)
            - - - Picus – 13 species
                - - Chrysophlegma – 3 species
                  - - Pardipicus – 2 species
                    - - Geocolaptes – ground woodpecker
                      - Campethera – 10 species
              - - - Mulleripicus – 4 species
                  - Dryocopus – 6 species
                - - Celeus – 12 species
                  - - Piculus – 7 species
                    - Colaptes – 14 species
          - - Campephilini
              - Campephilus – 12 species
              - - Blythipicus – 2 species
                - Chrysocolaptes – 10 species
            - Melanerpini
              - - - Sphyrapicus – 4 species (sapsuckers)
                  - Melanerpes – 23 species
                - - - Picoides – 3 species
                    - Yungipicus – 7 species
                  - - - Dendrocoptes – 4 species (including Leiopicus)
                      - - Chloropicus – 3 species
                        - Dendropicos – 12 species
                    - - Dendrocopos – 12 species
                      - - Dryobates – 6 species
                        - - Leuconotopicus – 6 species
                          - Veniliornis – 14 species

=== List of genera ===
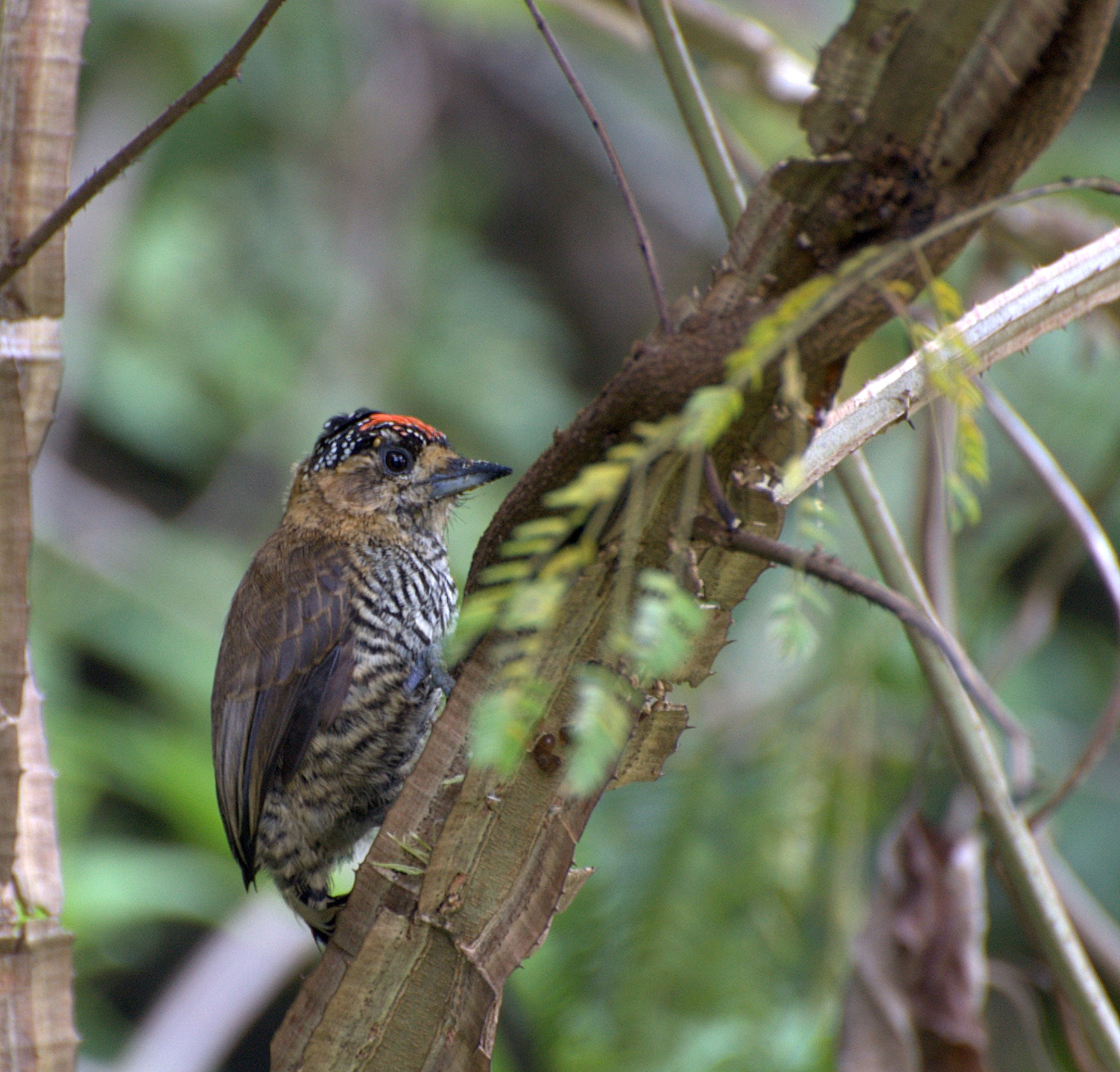
Ochre-collared piculet (Picumnus temminckii)

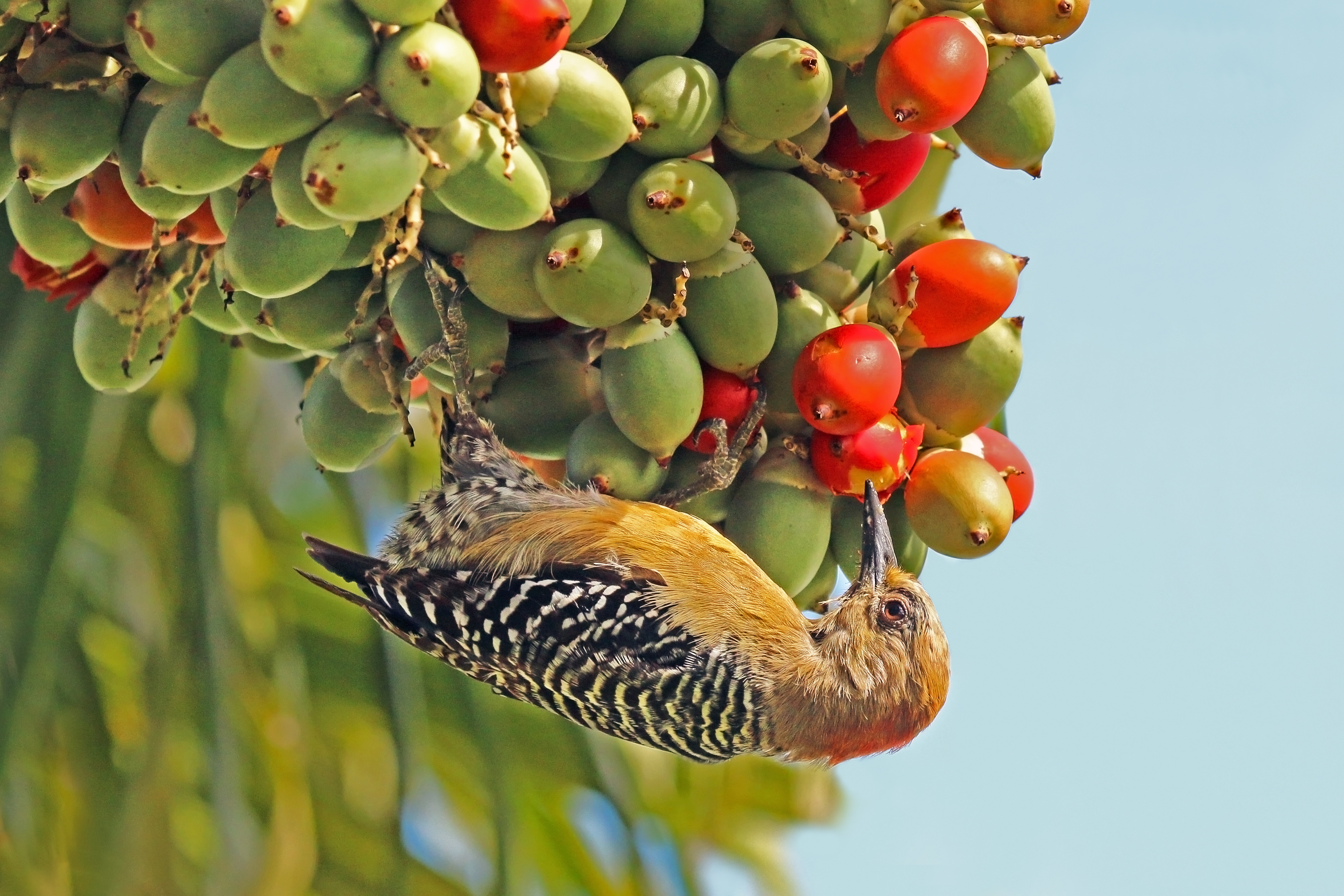
Red-crowned woodpecker (Melanerpes rubricapillus rubricapillus) female, Tobago

The woodpecker family Picidae contains 36 genera. For more detail, see list of woodpecker species.

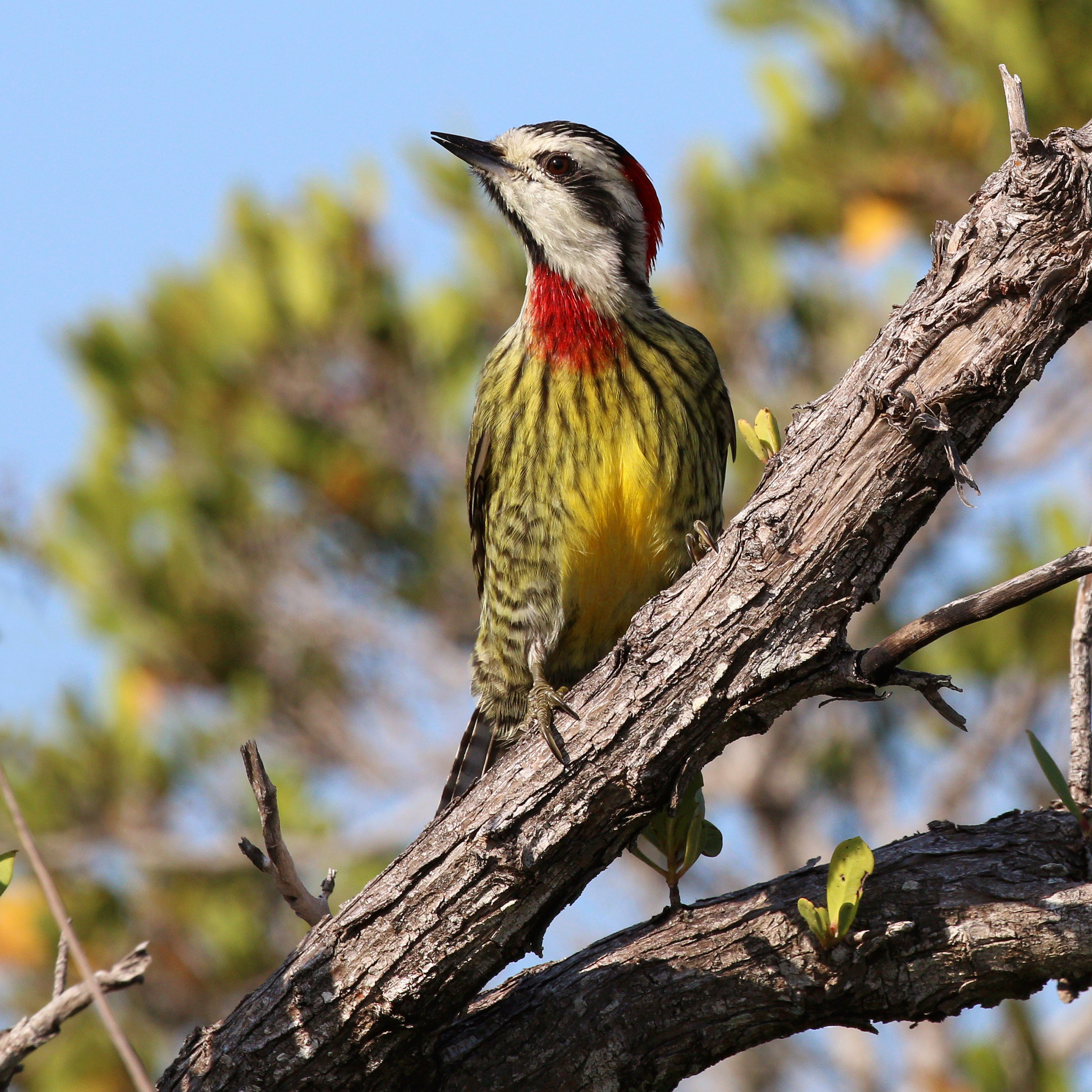
Cuban green woodpecker (Xiphidiopicus percussus) female, Cuba

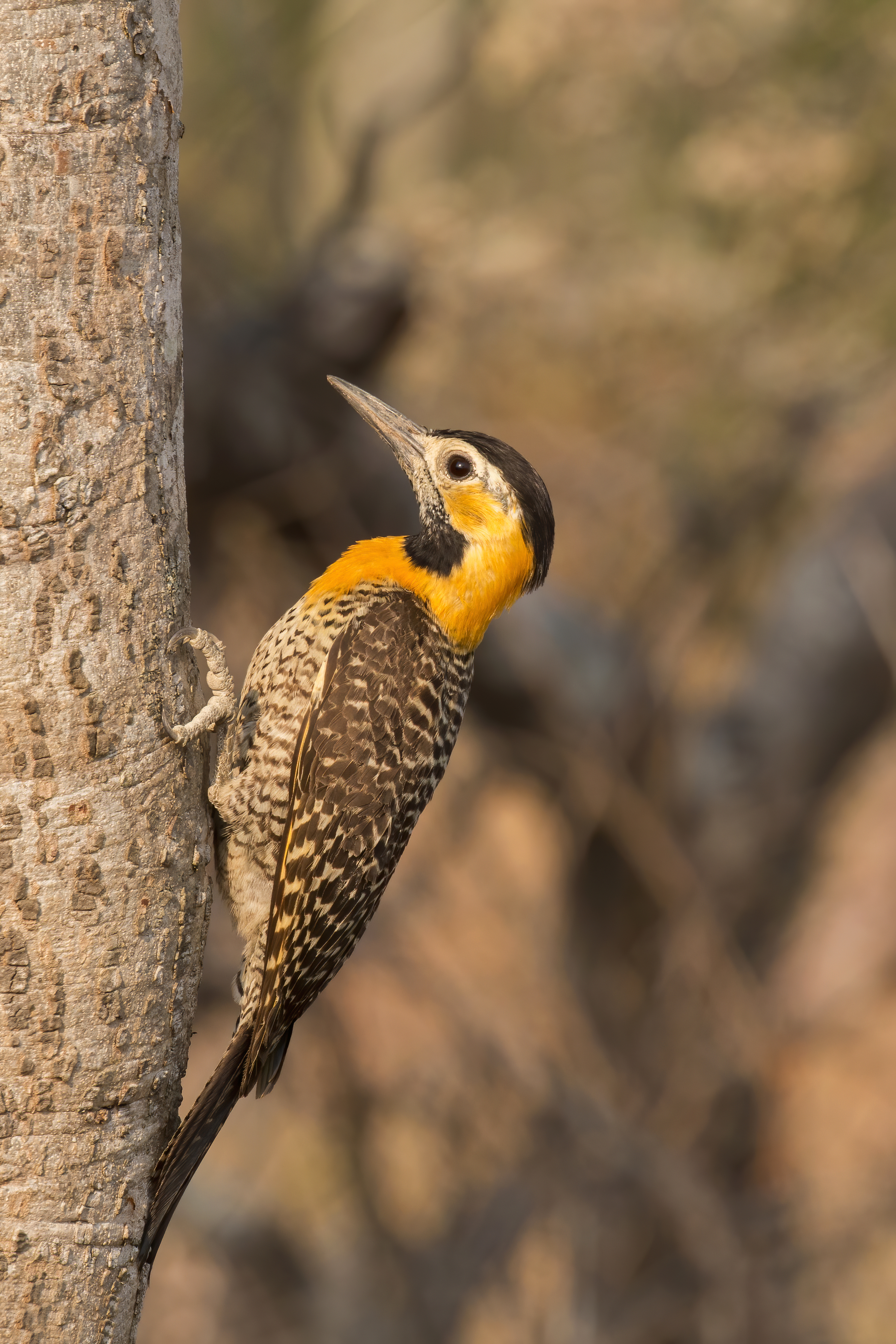
Campo flicker Colaptes campestris female, Brazil

Family: Picidae

- Subfamily: Jynginae – wrynecks
  - Jynx (2 species)
- Subfamily: Picumninae – piculets
  - Picumnus – piculets (25 species)
- Subfamily: Sasiinae
  - Verreauxia – African piculet
  - Sasia – Asian piculets (2 species)
- Subfamily: Picinae – true woodpeckers
  - Tribe Nesoctitini
    - Nesoctites – monotypic: Antillean piculet
  - Tribe Hemicircini
    - Hemicircus – 2 species
  - Tribe Picini
    - Micropternus – monotypic: rufous woodpecker
    - Meiglyptes – 4 species
    - Gecinulus – 3 species
    - Dinopium – 5 species (flamebacks)
    - Picus – 13 species
    - Chrysophlegma – 3 species
    - Pardipicus – 2 species
    - Geocolaptes – monotypic: ground woodpecker
    - Campethera – 10 species
    - Mulleripicus – 4 species
    - Dryocopus – 6 species
    - Celeus – 12 species
    - Piculus – 7 species
    - Colaptes – 15 species
  - Tribe Campephilini
    - Campephilus – 12 species
    - Blythipicus – 2 species
    - Chrysocolaptes – 10 species (flamebacks)
  - Tribe Melanerpini
    - Sphyrapicus – 4 species (sapsuckers)
    - Melanerpes – 23 species
    - Picoides – 3 species
    - Yungipicus – 7 species
    - Leiopicus – monotypic: yellow-crowned woodpecker
    - Dendrocoptes – 3 species
    - Chloropicus – 3 species
    - Dendropicos – 12 species
    - Dendrocopos – 12 species
    - Dryobates – 6 species
    - Leuconotopicus – 6 species
    - Veniliornis – 14 species
    - Xiphidiopicus – monotypic: Cuban green woodpecker
- Incertae sedis fossils
  - Genus: †Palaeopicus (Late Oligocene of France)
  - †Picidae gen. et sp. indet. (Middle Miocene of New Mexico, US)
  - †Picidae gen. et sp. indet. (Late Miocene of Gargano Peninsula, Italy)
  - Genus: †Palaeonerpes (Ogallala Early Pliocene of Hitchcock County, US) – possibly dendropicine
  - Genus: †Pliopicus (Early Pliocene of Kansas, US) – possibly dendropicine
  - cf. Colaptes DMNH 1262 (Early Pliocene of Ainsworth, US) – malarpicine?

== Relationship with humans ==
Many woodpecker species are known to excavate holes in buildings, fencing, and utility poles, creating health and/or safety issues for affected structures. Such activity is very difficult to discourage and can be costly to repair.

Woodpeckers also drum on various reverberatory structures on buildings such as gutters, downspouts, chimneys, vents, and aluminium sheeting. Drumming is a less-forceful type of pecking that serves to establish territory and attract mates. Houses with shingles or wooden boarding are also attractive as possible nesting or roosting sites, especially when close to large trees or woodland. Several exploratory holes may be made, especially at the junctions of vertical boards or at the corners of tongue-and-groove boarding. The birds may also drill holes in houses as they forage for insect larvae and pupae hidden behind the woodwork.

Woodpeckers sometimes cause problems when they raid fruit crops, but their foraging activities are mostly beneficial as they control forest insect pests such as the woodboring beetles that create galleries behind the bark and can kill trees. They also eat ants, which may be tending sap-sucking pests such as mealybugs, as is the case with the rufous woodpecker in coffee plantations in India. Woodpeckers can serve as indicator species, demonstrating the quality of the habitat. Their hole-making abilities make their presence in an area an important part of the ecosystem, because these cavities are used for breeding and roosting by many bird species that are unable to excavate their own holes, as well as being used by various mammals and invertebrates.

The spongy bones of the woodpecker's skull and the flexibility of its beak, both of which provide protection for the brain when drumming, have provided inspiration to engineers; the study of woodpeckers has led to applications in the design of protective helmets and airplane black boxes.

== In culture ==
One of the accounts of the founding of Rome, preserved in the work known as Origo Gentis Romanae (unknown), refers to a legend of a woodpecker bringing food to the boys Romulus and Remus during the time they were abandoned in the wild, thus enabling them to survive and play their part in history. Several people in Greek and Roman mythology are transformed into woodpeckers, including Picus, Lelante, Polyphonte's old maid, one of the Pierides, Polytechnus, and Celeus.

Woody Woodpecker is an animated character that appeared in theatrical short films produced between 1940 and 1972.

The Pokémon Pikipek was introduced in the seventh generation games Pokémon Sun and Moon. In addition to being a visual homage to a pileated woodpecker, entries in the game's Pokédex encyclopedia describes the small Flying-type as analogous to its real-world counterpart. Its later forms (called "evolutions" in the series) Trumbeak and Toucannon resemble a honeyguide and toucan, respectively, perhaps as a tongue-in-cheek reference to the phylogenetic relationship woodpeckers share with these Piciformes families.

== Status and conservation ==
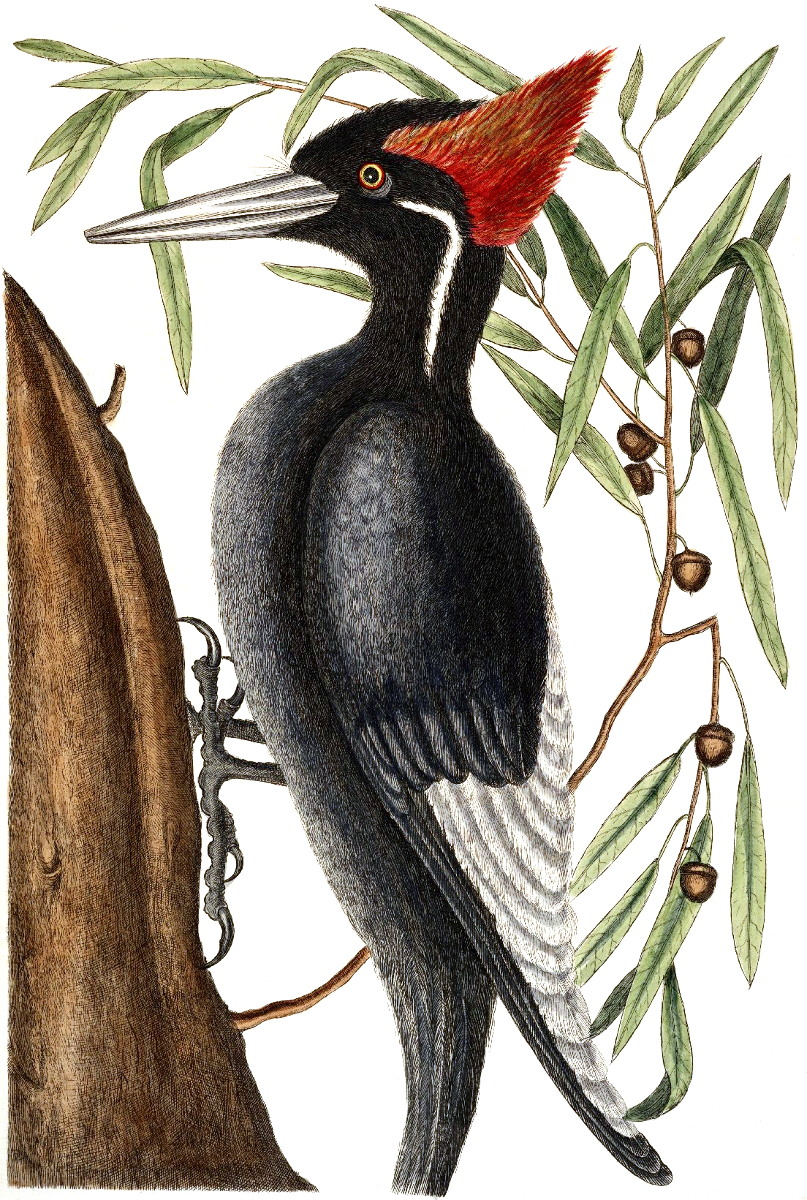
The ivory-billed woodpecker is classified as critically endangered by the IUCN, and some authorities believe it may already be extinct.

In a global survey of the risk of extinction faced by the various bird families, woodpeckers were the only bird family to have significantly fewer species at risk than would be expected.

Nevertheless, several woodpeckers are under threat as their habitats are destroyed. Being woodland birds, deforestation and clearance of land for agriculture and other purposes can reduce populations dramatically. Some species adapt to living in plantations and secondary growth, or to open countryside with forest remnants and scattered trees, but some do not. A few species have even flourished when they have adapted to man-made habitats. There are few conservation projects directed primarily at woodpeckers, but they benefit whenever their habitat is conserved. The red-cockaded woodpecker has been the focus of much conservation effort in the southeastern United States, with artificial cavities being constructed in the longleaf pines they favour as nesting sites.

Two species of woodpeckers in the Americas are on the verge of extinction: the ivory-billed woodpecker, which is classified as critically endangered; and the imperial woodpecker, which is classified as extinct in the wild. Some authorities believe them to be extinct, though possible but disputed ongoing sightings of ivory-billed woodpeckers have been made in the United States and a small population may survive in Cuba. A critically endangered species is the Okinawa woodpecker from Japan, with a single declining population of a few hundred birds. They are threatened by deforestation, golf courses, dams, helipad construction, road building, and agricultural development.

== Brain impact research ==
=== Anatomy ===
Woodpeckers have sophisticated shock-absorption mechanisms to help protect their heads from injury. Micro-CT scans show that plate-like spongy bones are unevenly distributed in the skull, highly accumulated in the forehead and occiput but not in other regions. Along with the long hyoid bone "safety belt" the woodpecker has uneven beak lengths which drastically reduce strains when compared to equal length. Models have shown that pecking force is shifted into the body at around 99% absorption while only 1% is in the head. The head has other factors that reduce strain to the brain: small portions of energy are dissipated in the form of heat, therefore the pecks are always intermittent. Others dispute shock-absorption by the head (which reduces pecking force) but instead point to adaptations within the brain itself.

Tau protein accumulation is associated with chronic traumatic encephalopathy (CTE), and thus has been studied in sports where athletes suffer repeated concussions. Tau helps hold together and stabilize brain neurons. Woodpecker brains share similarities to humans with CTE showing most build-up in the frontal and temporal lobes of the brain. It is not yet known whether these accumulations are pathological or the result of behavioral changes. More research is being done on the subject and the woodpecker is a suitable animal model to study. The orientation of the brain within the skull increases the area of contact when pecking, to reduce stress on the brain and their small size helps, given the acceleration speeds.

=== Mechanical properties ===
Straight-line trajectory was theorized to be the reason why woodpeckers do not injure themselves, since centripetal forces were the cause of concussion, but they do not always peck in straight lines, so they produce and resist centripetal forces. Laboratory tests show that the woodpeckers' cranial bone produces a significantly higher Young's modulus and ultimate strength scores compared to other birds its size. The cranial bone has a high bone mineral density with plate-like structures that are thick with high numbers of trabeculae spaced closely together which all may lead to lower deformation while pecking.

The jaw apparatus was studied, looking into its cushioning effects. When comparing the same impact to the beak and to the forehead, the forehead experiences an impact force 1.72 times that of the beak, due to the contact time of 3.25 ms in the forehead and 4.9 ms in the beak. This is impulse momentum where impulse is the integral of force over time. The quadrate bone and joints play an important role in extending impact time, which decreases impact load to brain tissue.

== Bio-inspired ideas ==
=== Beams ===
Bio-inspired honeycomb sandwich beams are inspired by the woodpecker's skull design; this beam's goal is to withstand continuous impacts without the need of replacement. The BHSB is composed of carbon fiber-reinforced plastic (CFRP), this is to mimic the high-strength beak. Next is a rubber layer core for the hyoid bone for absorbing and spreading impact, a second core layer of aluminum honeycomb that is porous and light like the woodpecker's spongey bone for impact cushioning. The final layer is the same as the first a CFRP to act as the skull bone. Bio-inspired honeycomb sandwich beams when compared to conventional beams reduced area damage by 50–80% and carried 40 to 5% of the level of stresses in the bottom layer while having an impact-resistance efficiency 1.65 to 16.22 times higher.

== Cited sources ==
- Gorman G (2014). Woodpeckers of the World: A Photographic Guide. Firefly Books. ISBN 978-1-77085-309-6.
