= Black-dotted piculet =

Conservation status
- Least Concern (IUCN 3.1)

Scientific classification
- Kingdom: Animalia
- Phylum: Chordata
- Class: Aves
- Order: Piciformes
- Family: Picidae
- Genus: Picumnus
- Species: P. squamulatus
- Subspecies: P. s. nigropunctatus

Trinomial name
- Picumnus squamulatus nigropunctatus Zimmer & Phelps, 1950

Species of woodpecker

The black-dotted piculet (Picumnus squamulatus nigropunctatus), also known as the black-spotted piculet, is a subspecies of bird in subfamily Picumninae of the woodpecker family Picidae. It is endemic to Venezuela.

== Taxonomy and systematics ==
The taxonomy of the black-dotted piculet is unsettled. It has variously been treated as conspecific with the white-bellied piculet (P. spilogaster) and with the golden-spangled piculet (P. exilis). It has also been treated as a junior synonym of P. salvinii which itself has been subsumed into the golden-spangled piculet, and as a synonym of one subspecies of scaled piculet (P. squamulatus obsoletus).

BirdLife International's Handbook of the Birds of the World treat this taxon as a species. The International Ornithological Committee (IOC) and the Clements taxonomy treats it as the scaled piculet subspecies P. squamulatus obsoletus. The South American Classification Committee of the American Ornithological Society does not recognize it as a species.

== Description ==
The black-dotted piculet resembles other members of the genus Picumnus. Its most distinctive mark is pale pure yellow underparts with sparse black dots on the lower breast and usually on the belly and undertail coverts. In southeastern Sucre, a few have finely barred chests. Rare individuals with scaly throats and pale buffy (rather than yellow) underparts resemble the scaled piculet, which can be distinguished by its scaly lower underparts. The crown is black with narrow scarlet streaks on the forepart and conspicuous white dots on the rear part, or throughout in some females. The upperparts are light olive-brown, slightly yellowish, with dusky spots on the shoulders and back.

== Distribution and habitat ==
The black-dotted piculet is locally common in areas with bushes or trees (possibly including mangroves), near water or waterlogged, in the Venezuelan coastal lowlands between southeastern Sucre and southern Delta Amacuro. In elevation it occurs almost entirely below 100 m (300 ft)

== Behavior ==
=== Feeding ===
The black-dotted piculet forages in pairs, often widely separated, or alone. They occasionally join mixed-species foraging flocks. They often "hitch sideways along branches," and they peck or drill in rotting wood and at broken ends of branches.

=== Vocalization ===
The black-dotted piculet's song is "2 to several extremely high, thin notes, each slightly lower than the preceding, tseeet, tseeet, tsee, etc." Possibly it is also used as a contact call. Foraging birds may repeat the song a few times and then fall silent for several minutes.

== Status ==
The IUCN has assessed the black-dotted piculet as being of Least Concern, though it has a limited range, and its population size is unknown and believed to be decreasing. No immediate threats have been identified.
