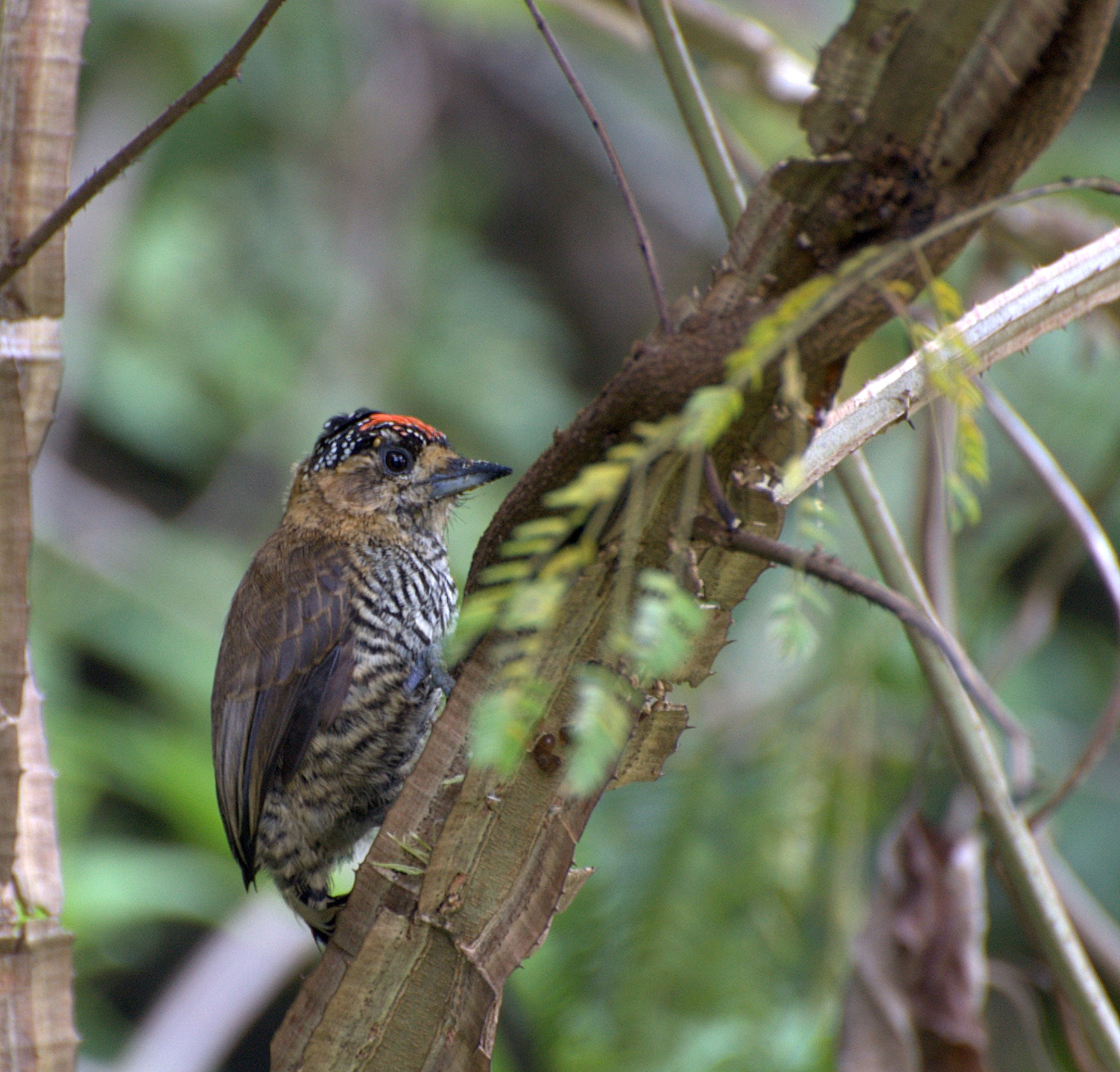
- Ochre-collared piculet

Scientific classification
- Kingdom: Animalia
- Phylum: Chordata
- Class: Aves
- Order: Piciformes
- Family: Picidae
- Subfamily: Picumninae

Genera
- Picumnus; Verreauxia; Sasia

= Piculet =

Piculets

Subfamily of birds

The piculets are a distinctive subfamily, Picumninae, of small woodpeckers which occur mainly in tropical South America, with just three Asian and one African species.

Like the true woodpeckers, piculets have large heads, long tongues which they use to extract their insect prey and zygodactyl feet, with two toes pointing forward, and two backwards. However, they lack the stiff tail feathers that the true woodpeckers use when climbing trees, so they are more likely than their relatives to perch on a branch rather than an upright trunk.

Their bills are shorter and less dagger-like than the true woodpeckers, so they look for insects and grubs mainly in decaying wood. Similarly, they re-use woodpecker holes for nesting, rather than making their own holes. The eggs are white, as with many hole nesters.

Typically these birds have grey or dull green upperparts and dark-streaked white underparts.

== Systematics and evolution ==
Although not well known from fossils, the evolution of piculets is now considered rather straightforward. The disjunct occurrence of the genera, with one African species of the Southeast Asian Sasia and one Southeast Asian species of the American Picumnus is of comparatively recent origin. Molecular dating, calibrated with geographic events in the absence of a good fossil record, points at the Late Miocene, c. 8 MYA, as the point where the two genera divided into their two respective lineages. At that time, there was a notable global cooling period. The molecular distances between piculets and woodpeckers are comparatively small for subfamilies, agreeing with the hypothesis that the split between the three groups of woodpecker-like picids subfamilies occurred only during the Miocene climatic optimum, around 15 MYA. The later radiation of South American piculets is probably due to changes in topology and climate fluctuations during the Pliocene and Pleistocene. The genus Verreauxia may be accepted because of pronounced morphological similarities, but the two Picumnus lineages, despite having diverged long ago, are virtually alike except for head coloration.

The Antillean piculet (Nesoctites micromegas) has proven to be a very distinct species evolutionarily between piculets and woodpeckers and thus is nowadays placed in a subfamily of its own.

The arrangement of species in the genera is as follows

Genus Picumnus

- Speckled piculet, P. innominatus
- Bar-breasted piculet, P. aurifrons
- Orinoco piculet, P. pumilus
- Lafresnaye's piculet, P. lafresnayi
- Golden-spangled piculet, P. exilis
- Black-dotted piculet, P. nigropunctatus
- Ecuadorian piculet, P. sclateri
- Scaled piculet, P. squamulatus
- White-bellied piculet, P. spilogaster
- Arrowhead piculet, P. minutissimus
- Spotted piculet, P. pygmaeus
- Speckle-chested piculet, P. steindachneri
- Varzea piculet, P. varzeae
- White-barred piculet, P. cirratus
- Ocellated piculet, P. dorbignyanus
- Ochre-collared piculet, P. temminckii
- White-wedged piculet, P. albosquamatus
- Rusty-necked piculet, P. fuscus
- Rufous-breasted piculet, P. rufiventris
- Ochraceous piculet, P. limae
- Mottled piculet, P. nebulosus
- Plain-breasted piculet, P. castelnau
- Fine-barred piculet, P. subtilis
- Olivaceous piculet, P. olivaceus
- Greyish piculet, P. granadensis
- Chestnut piculet, P. cinnamomeus

Genus Sasia

- Rufous piculet, S. abnormis
- White-browed piculet, S. ochracea

Genus Verreauxia

- African piculet, V. africana
