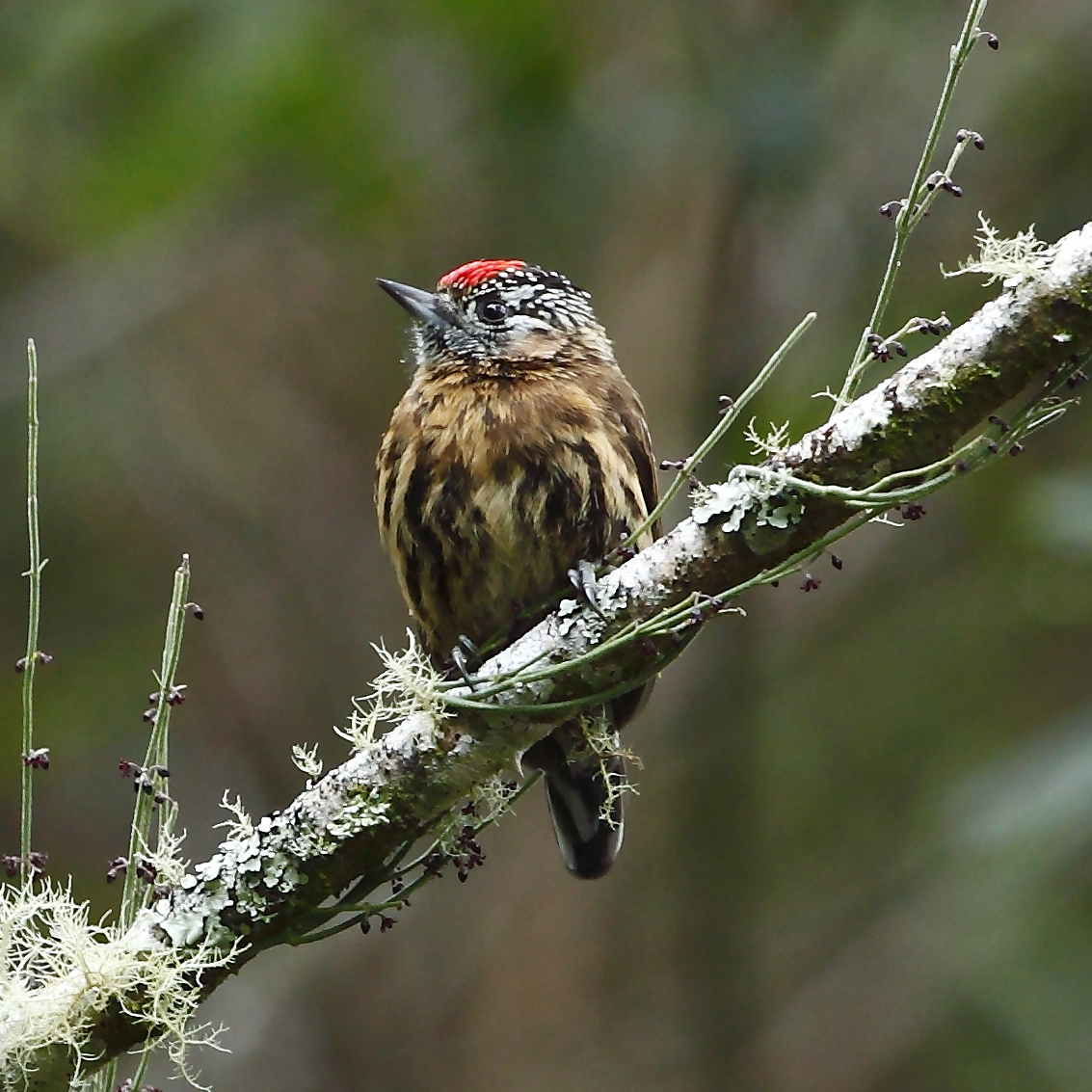
- Adult male at Urupema, Santa Catarina state, Brazil

Conservation status
- Near Threatened (IUCN 3.1)

Scientific classification
- Kingdom: Animalia
- Phylum: Chordata
- Class: Aves
- Order: Piciformes
- Family: Picidae
- Genus: Picumnus
- Species: P. nebulosus

Binomial name
- Picumnus nebulosus Sundevall, 1866

= Mottled piculet =

Species of woodpecker

The mottled piculet (Picumnus nebulosus) is a Near Threatened species of bird in subfamily Picumninae of the woodpecker family Picidae. It is found in Argentina, Brazil, and Uruguay.

== Taxonomy and systematics ==
The mottled piculet is monotypic. The population in southeastern Brazil was treated by some authors as a separate species P. iheringi but it is now known to be synonymous with P. nebulosus.

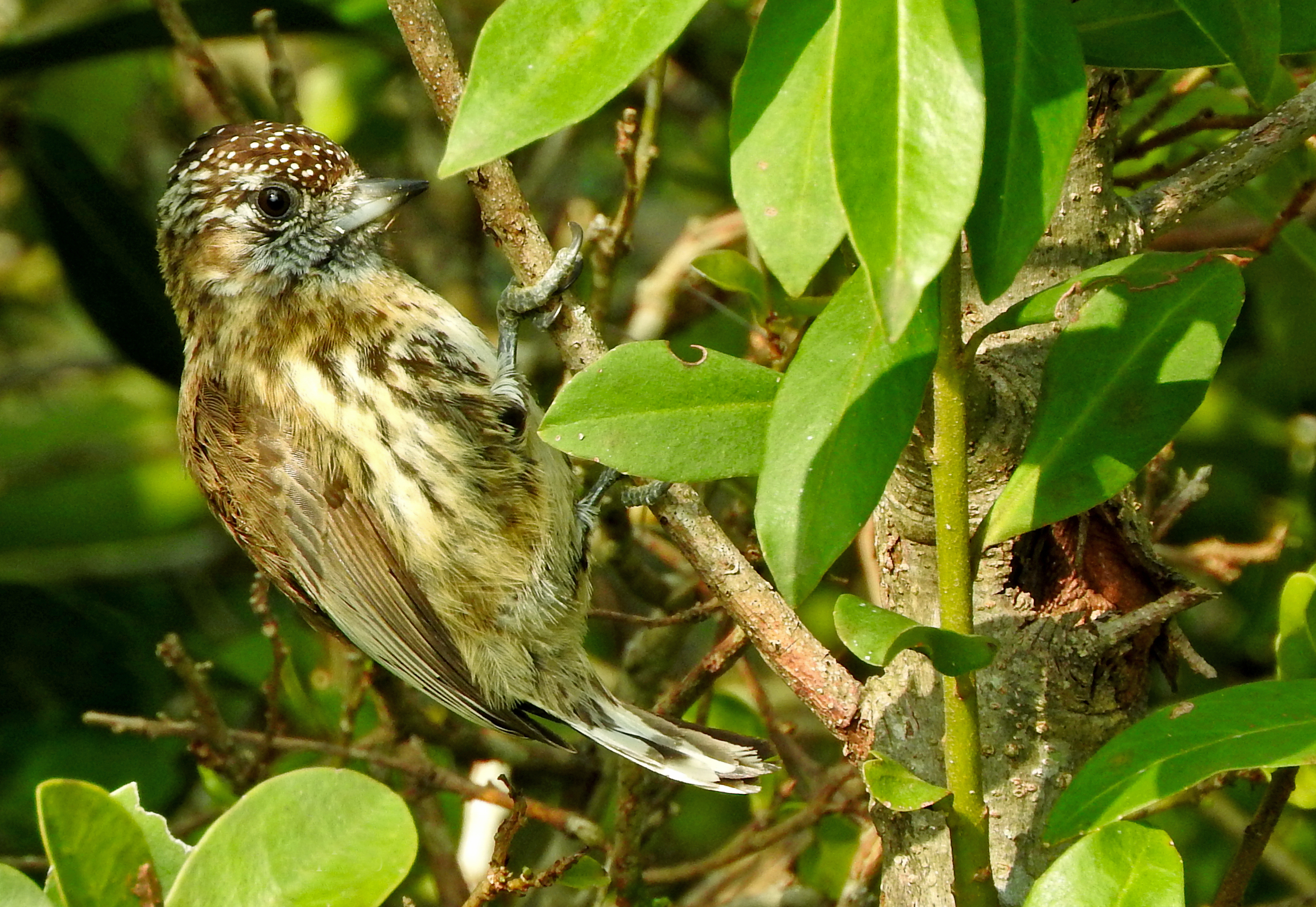
Picumnus nebulosus in Quebrada de los Cuervos, Uruguay

== Description ==
The mottled piculet is 10 to 11 cm (3.9 to 4.3 in) long and weighs 11 to 12 g (0.39 to 0.42 oz). Adult males have a black cap and nape with a red patch on the forehead and white spots on the rest of it. Their face is mostly dark olive-brown with some white. Their hindneck and upperparts are warm olive-brown with a buff or rusty tinge on the back. Their flight feathers are dark brown to blackish with wide pale edges on the secondaries and tertials. Their tail is black; the innermost pair of feathers have mostly white inner webs and the outer three pairs have a white streak on the outer web. Their chin and throat are white with thin black bars. Their breast is buffish brown, sometimes with dark streaks. Their belly is pale buff and their flanks a richer buff with wide blackish streaks. Their iris is brown, the orbital ring grayish, the beak black with a gray base to the mandible, and the legs gray. Adult females are identical but with white spots throughout the cap and no red. Juveniles are duller than adults and have an dull brown crown with pale buffish streaks.

== Distribution and habitat ==
The mottled piculet has an almost unique range. It is found from southeastern Brazil's Paraná state south through eastern Uruguay and into Argentina's Misiones and Corrientes provinces. Its typical habitat is lowland evergreen Atlantic forest and Araucaria forest, but it also occurs in gallery forest, bamboo thickets, scrubland, and wooded savannah. In elevation it mostly occurs up to 1,100 m (3,600 ft) but has been found as high as 1,400 m (4,600 ft).

== Behavior ==
=== Movement ===
The mottled piculet is mostly sedentary but is thought to also make some elevational movements.

=== Feeding ===
The mottled piculet forages in dense vegetation of the understory and also in trees up to about 8 m (26 ft) above the ground. It takes insect larvae from thin branches, vines, and bamboo stems. It usually forages alone but will join mixed species foraging flocks.

=== Breeding ===
The mottled piculet's breeding season is from October to December. Nothing else is known about its breeding biology.

=== Vocal and non-vocal sounds ===
The mottled piculet's vocalisations are limited to a repetitive "seep" or "cheep", sometimes linked into a brief trill, and an occasional humming sound. The alarm call is a shrill cricket-like whistling sound. It also drums, particularly on bamboo, in an irregular pattern of two to four rapid strikes.

== Status ==
The IUCN has assessed the mottled piculet as Near Threatened. It has a somewhat limited range and an unknown population size that is believed to be decreasing. "Current key threats are urbanisation, industrialisation, agricultural expansion, colonisation and associated road-building ." It is considered local and uncommon in Argentina and Uruguay, and more common in Brazil.
