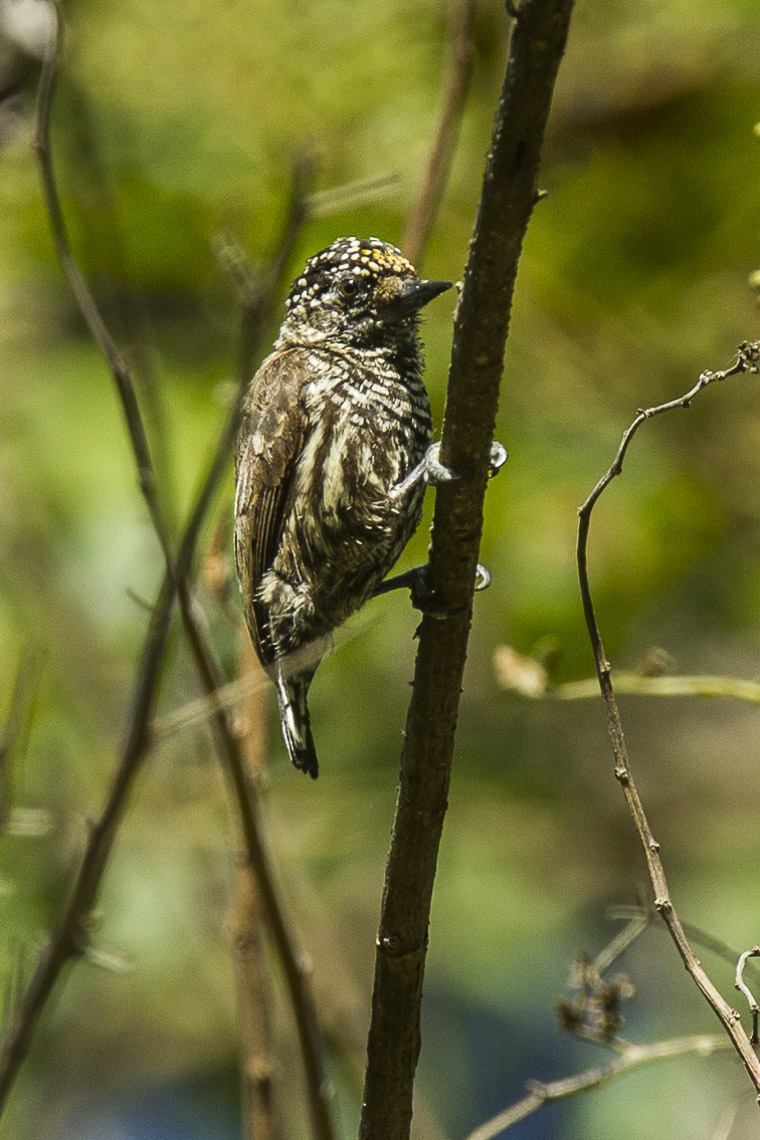

Conservation status
- Least Concern (IUCN 3.1)

Scientific classification
- Kingdom: Animalia
- Phylum: Chordata
- Class: Aves
- Order: Piciformes
- Family: Picidae
- Genus: Picumnus
- Species: P. sclateri

Binomial name
- Picumnus sclateri Taczanowski, 1877

= Ecuadorian piculet =

Species of woodpecker

The Ecuadorian piculet (Picumnus sclateri) is a species of bird in subfamily Picumninae of the woodpecker family Picidae. It is found in Ecuador and Peru.

== Taxonomy and systematics ==
The Ecuadorian piculet has three subspecies, the nominate P. s. sclateri (Taczanowski, 1877), P. s. parvistriatus (Chapman, 1921), and P. s. porcullae (Bond, J, 1954). P. s. parvistriatus was originally described as a separate species.

== Description ==
The Ecuadorian piculet is 9 to 10 cm (3.5 to 3.9 in) long and weighs about 10 to 12 g (0.35 to 0.42 oz). Adult males of the nominate subspecies have a black cap with tiny yellow spots on the forehead and tiny white ones on the rest of it. Their upperparts are gray-brown with obscure darker bars. The upper side of their tail is blackish; the innermost pair of feathers have mostly white inner webs and the outer three pairs have a white area near the tip. Their underparts are whitish with black or dusky barring on the breast and flanks and black streaks on the belly. Adult females are identical but for whitish spots on their entire crown.

Subspecies P. s. parvistriatus has larger white spots on the crown than the nominate, and the bars and streaks on the underparts are much thinner. P. s. porcullae has pale beige streaking on the upperparts and its underparts have black barring and little to no streaking.

== Distribution and habitat ==
Subspecies P. s. parvistriatus of the Ecuadorian piculet is the northernmost, and its range is separate from that of the other two. It is found in western Ecuador from Manabí Province to northern Guayas Province. P. s. sclateri is found from El Oro and Loja provinces in southwestern Ecuador south into extreme northwestern Peru. P. s. porcullae is found in northwestern Peru's departments of Piura and Lambayeque.

The Ecuadorian piculet primarily inhabits deciduous forest and arid scrublands, though in Loja it also occurs in more humid landscapes. In elevation it ranges in Ecuador from near sea level to about 1,700 m (5,600 ft), though mostly is below 800 m (2,600 ft). In Peru it occurs up to 1,800 m (5,900 ft) but mostly is below 1,200 m (3,900 ft).

== Behavior ==
=== Feeding ===
The Ecuadorian piculet's diet is mostly very small insects but is not known in detail. It actively forages on thin branches, picking and tapping.

=== Social behavior ===
The Ecuadorian piculet is usually seen singly, in pairs, or in small groups that might be families. It often associates with loose flocks of other small passerines.

=== Breeding ===
The Ecuadorian piculet's breeding season in Ecuador is from July through September and in Peru from June to September. Nothing else is known about its breeding biology.

=== Vocalization ===
The Ecuadorian piculet is described as "rather quiet", but does have an apparent song that is "a slow, descending series of notes (generally 3, sometimes up to 7): swee swee swee". It also makes "a high-pitched tseee-tsut or tseeet" and "a quick, stuttering series...tititi-swee."

== Status ==
The IUCN has assessed the Ecuadorian piculet as being of Least Concern. It has a restricted range, and though its population size is not known it is believed to be stable. No immediate threats have been identified. It is described as uncommon in both countries and "[h]uman activity has little short-term direct effect on [the] Ecuadorian Piculet, other than the local effects of habitat destruction."
