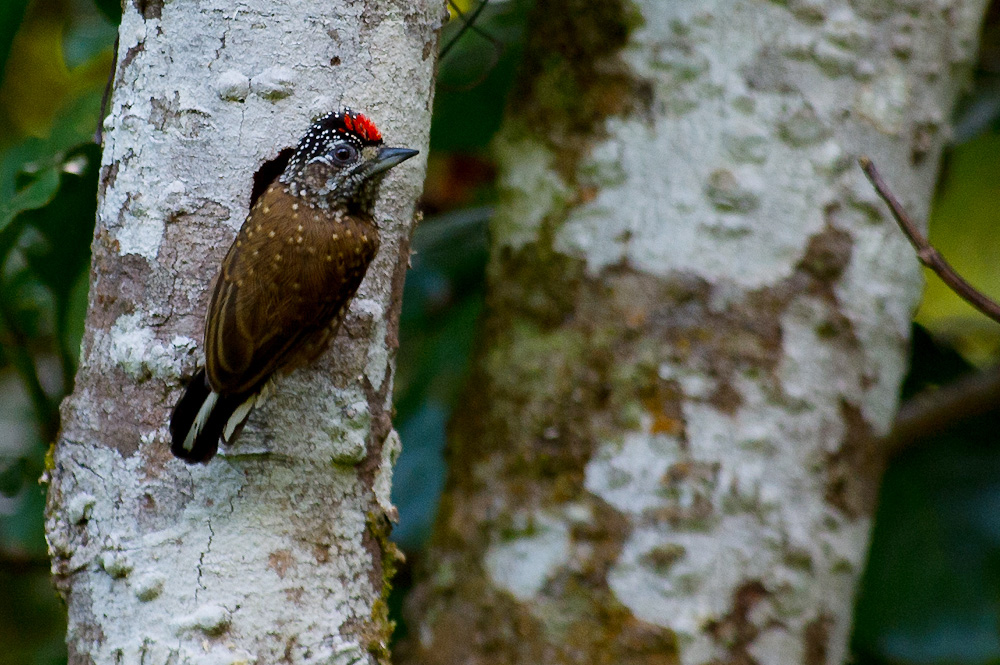

Conservation status
- Least Concern (IUCN 3.1)

Scientific classification
- Kingdom: Animalia
- Phylum: Chordata
- Class: Aves
- Order: Piciformes
- Family: Picidae
- Genus: Picumnus
- Species: P. pygmaeus

Binomial name
- Picumnus pygmaeus (Lichtenstein, MHC, 1823)

= Spotted piculet =

Species of woodpecker

The spotted piculet (Picumnus pygmaeus) is a species of bird in subfamily Picumninae of the woodpecker family Picidae. It is endemic to Brazil.

== Taxonomy and systematics ==
The spotted piculet is monotypic. However, some authors have suggested that the varzea piculet (P. varzeae) might be a subspecies of it. Others have suggested that it should be treated as having two subspecies, the nominate and P. p. distinctus.

== Description ==
The spotted piculet is about 10 cm (3.9 in) long. Adult males have a black cap with a red patch on the forehead and white spots on the rest of it. Their face is mostly dark brown with white tips on some feathers. Their upperparts are mostly dark brown whose feathers have black and white tips. Their rump is paler. Their flight feathers are dark brown with buff or cinnamon-buff edges and tips on the secondaries and tertials. Their tail is blackish; the innermost pair of feathers have mostly white inner webs and the outer two pairs have a white patch near the end. Their chin, throat, and sides of the neck are black and white in a variable pattern. Their underparts are light to darkish brown, usually with a rufous tinge, and large black and white spots. Adult females are identical but for no red on the forehead. Juveniles are generally duller than adults and their dots are less distinct.

== Distribution and habitat ==
The spotted piculet is found only in northeastern Brazil, in an area bounded by central Maranhão, Pernambuco, northeastern Goiás, and extreme northern Minas Gerais. It inhabits dry open woodland and caatinga shrublands.

== Behavior ==
=== Movement ===
As far as is known, the spotted piculet is a year-round resident throughout its range.

=== Feeding ===
Nothing is known about the spotted piculet's foraging technique or diet.

=== Breeding ===
The spotted piculet's breeding biology is essentially unknown. Nest building has been noted in December and a female was observed feeding a grown chick in October.

=== Vocalization ===
One author described the spotted piculet's vocalization as a "very high-pitched, squeaky 'tsirrrrr, tsi, tsi, tsi'." Another described it as a "very high, descending, fast, chivering trill 'ttrrrruh'."

== Status ==
The IUCN has assessed the spotted piculet as being of Least Concern. It has a large range but its population size and trend are not known. No immediate threats have been determined. The lack of knowledge about the species could be due to its being uncommon but it is possibly simply overlooked.
