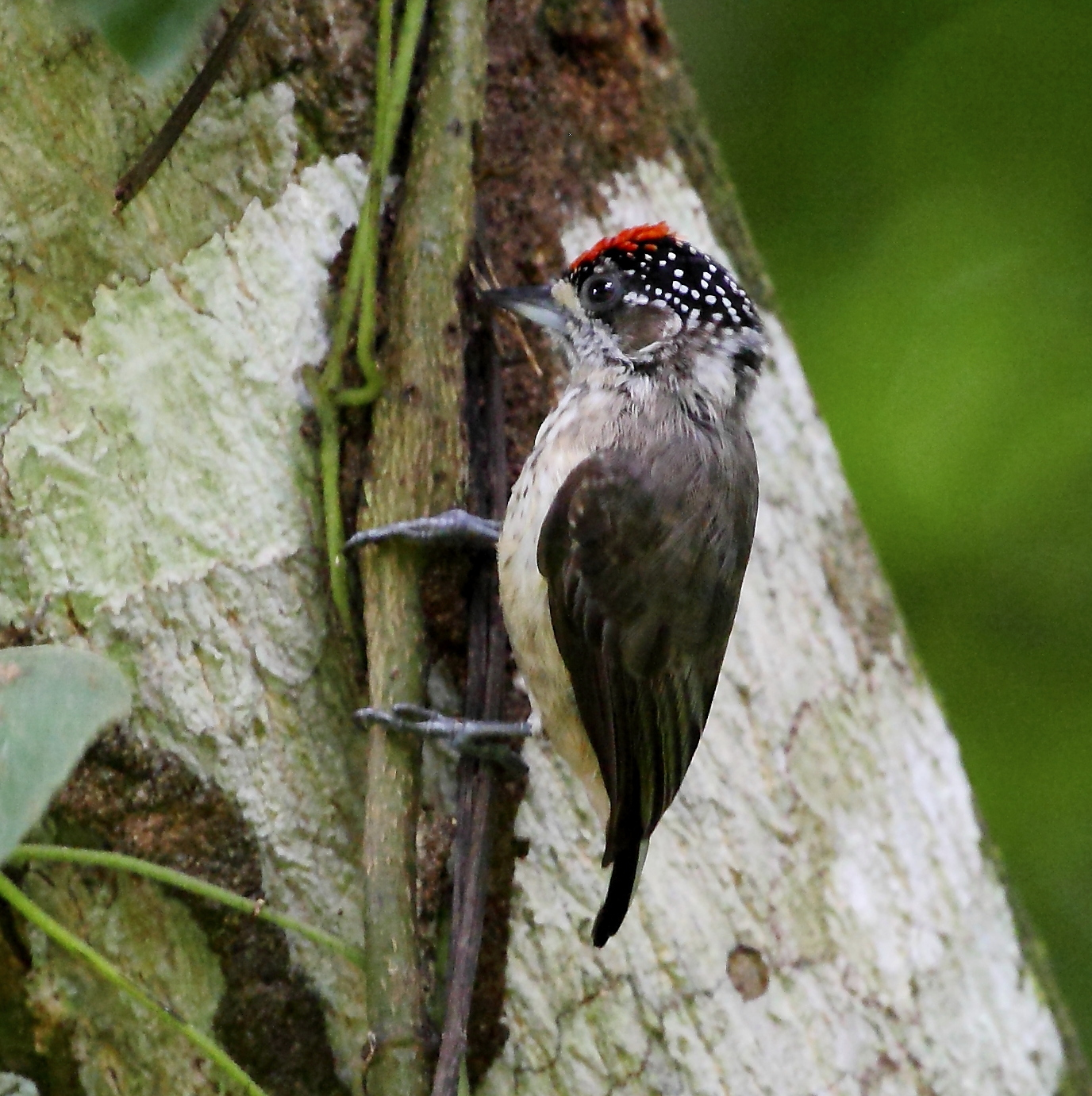
- A male ochraceous piculet at Guaramiranga, Ceará state, Brazil

Conservation status
- Least Concern (IUCN 3.1)

- Near Threatened (IUCN 3.1)

Scientific classification
- Kingdom: Animalia
- Phylum: Chordata
- Class: Aves
- Order: Piciformes
- Family: Picidae
- Genus: Picumnus
- Species: P. limae

Binomial name
- Picumnus limae Snethlage, 1924
- Range of northern population of ochraceous piculet (see text)

= Ochraceous piculet =

Species of woodpecker

The ochraceous piculet (Picumnus limae) is a species of bird in subfamily Picumninae of the woodpecker family Picidae. It is endemic to north-eastern Brazil.

== Taxonomy and systematics ==
The ochraceous piculet is monotypic according to the South American Classification Committee of the American Ornithological Society, the International Ornithological Committee, and the Clements taxonomy. However, BirdLife International's Handbook of the Birds of the World (HBW) treats the darker, southern, population as a separate species, the tawny piculet (P. fulvescens). The other three taxonomic systems had earlier separated them but have concluded that the color differences used for the differentiation are along a cline and that any division is arbitrary. The distribution along the color cline generally follows Gloger's rule.

This article follows the single-species model.

== Description ==
The ochraceous piculet is about 10 cm (3.9 in) long and weighs 8 to 12 g (0.28 to 0.42 oz). Adult males have a black cap with red tips on the forehead feathers and small white spots on the rest of the cap. Adult females are identical but for no red on the forehead. The species' upperparts vary from grayish to brownish with a whitish nape. Their underparts vary from whitish yellow to rusty brown, sometimes with paler streaks. Both the upper- and underparts' colors form a cline, with the lightest members in the north and darkest in the south. Their tail is blackish; the innermost pair of feathers have mostly white inner webs and the outer two pairs have a white patch near the end. Their iris is brown, the bill gray with a blackish tip, and the legs gray. Juveniles are similar to adults other than having a brown crown with white streaks on the side.

== Distribution and habitat ==
The ochraceous piculet occurs in northeastern Brazilian from the state of Ceará south to Sergipe and inland into Piauí. It inhabits a variety of landscapes within the Caatinga and Atlantic Forest ecoregions, from rather dry open forests in the north to dense humid ones in the south. It occurs both in primary forest and in human-modified ones such as urban parks.

== Behavior ==
=== Movement ===
The ochraceous piculet is a year-round resident throughout its range.

=== Feeding ===
Little detail is known about the foraging behavior and diet of the ochraceous piculet. It does feed on small branches; its diet is known to include insect larvae.

=== Breeding ===
The ochraceous piculet's breeding season apparently spans from November to August. Both sexes excavate a nest hole, which can be in the trunk of a tree or sometimes a fence post, and typically between 1 and 4 m (3 and 13 ft) above the ground. The clutch size varies from one to four eggs and both sexes incubate them and provision the nestlings. The incubation period and time to fledging are not known.

=== Vocalization ===
The ochraceous piculet's vocalizations vary little if at all among populations. Its song is generally a "series of high-pitched, fast trills starting with longer, higher frequency phrases and ending with shorter, lower frequency phrases." That of the northern population has been described as "tee-tee-tee-titiwi" and that of the southern ("tawny") population as "see-see-see-sisi-wi". The species' calls are "unrhythmic, short, high-pitched sounds delivered in a variety of behavioral contexts".

== Status ==
The IUCN follows HBW taxonomy and so has separately assessed the northern "ochraceous" (limae) and southern "tawny" (fulvescens) populations. It originally categorized limae as Vulnerable but since 2010 as being of Least Concern. Though its population size is not known it is believed to be stable. Its habitat has been significantly reduced by clearing for agriculture, grazing, and human expansion, but the species "appears to be able to persist in degraded and even urban habitats". The "tawny" fulvescens population, however, is assessed as Near Threatened after being rated as Vulnerable between 1994 and 2004. Its population, of unknown size, is believed to be declining due to "massive deforestation" by logging and conversion to sugarcane plantations and grazing land. The species occurs in several protected areas.
