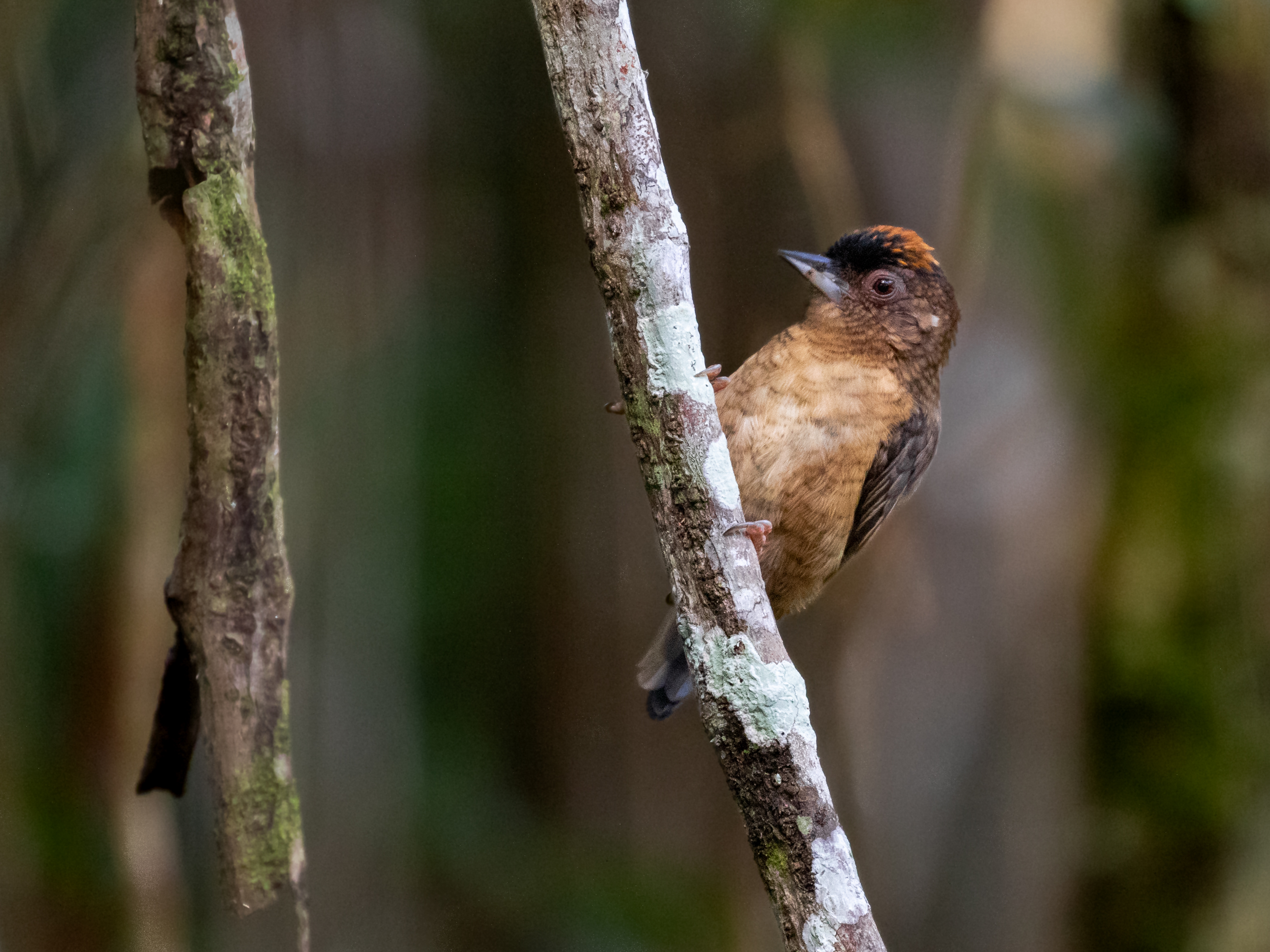
- male
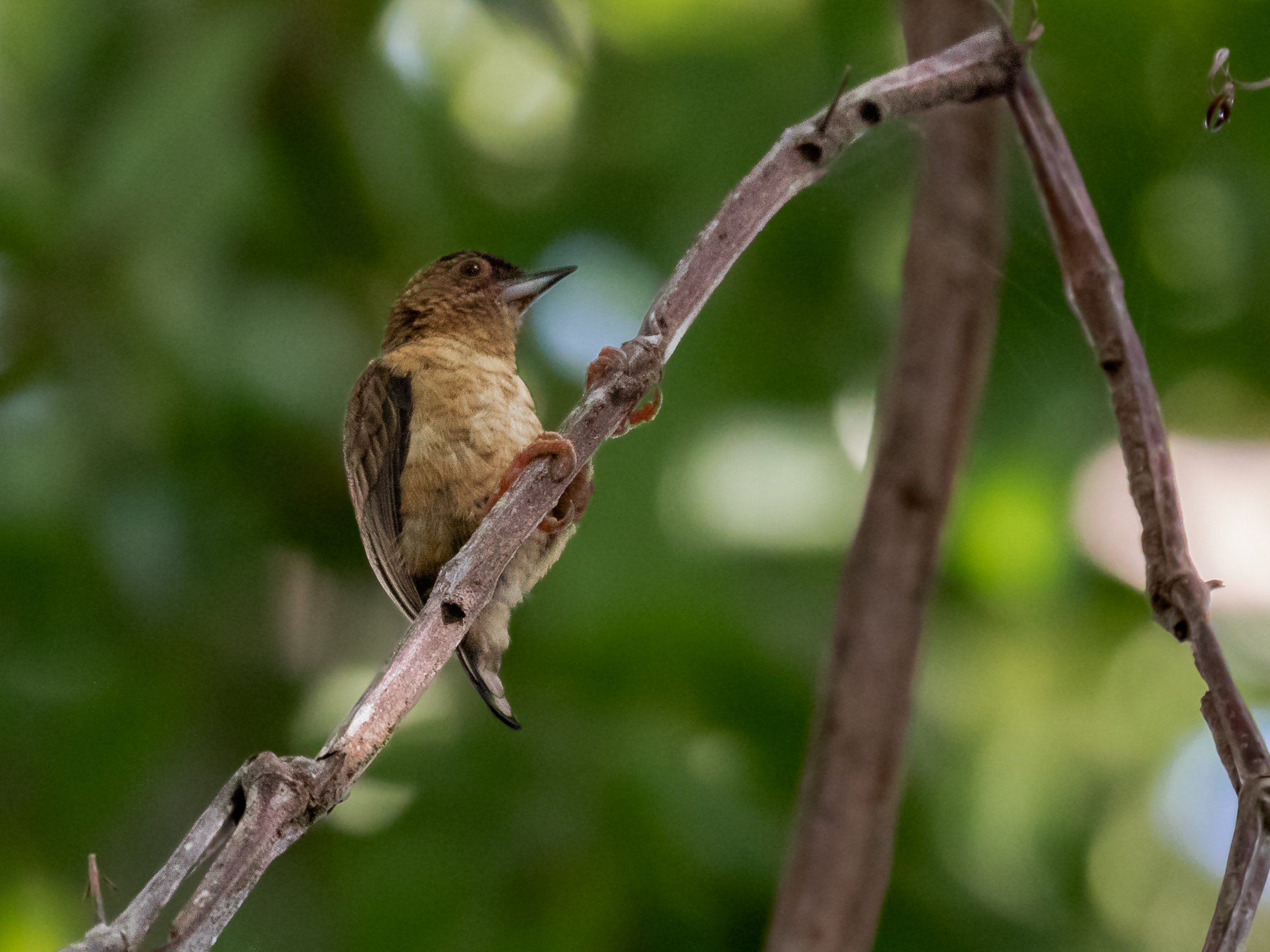
- female

Conservation status
- Least Concern (IUCN 3.1)

Scientific classification
- Kingdom: Animalia
- Phylum: Chordata
- Class: Aves
- Order: Piciformes
- Family: Picidae
- Genus: Picumnus
- Species: P. fuscus

Binomial name
- Picumnus fuscus Pelzeln, 1870

= Rusty-necked piculet =

Species of woodpecker

The rusty-necked piculet (Picumnus fuscus) is a species of bird in subfamily Picumninae of the woodpecker family Picidae. It is found along the Brazilian-Bolivian border.

== Taxonomy and systematics ==
Though the rusty-necked piculet was originally described in 1870, in the mid-twentieth century several authors considered it to be doubtfully valid or not valid at all. It has been generally accepted as a species since about 1982. It is monotypic.

== Description ==
The rusty-necked piculet is about 10 cm (3.9 in) long. Adult males have a head pattern that is unique among piculets: The top of the head is blackish with wide reddish-orange tips on the feathers of the hindcrown. Females' crowns are solid black; they are otherwise like the males. The adult's face is buffish brown with a rufous tinge and a pale stripe behind the eye; the sides and back of their neck is rusty buff to buff-brown. Their upperparts are brown to brownish green. Their flight feathers are dark brown with yellowish buff edges on the secondaries and tertials. Their tail is dark brown; the innermost pair of feathers have mostly white inner webs and the outer two pairs have a narrow white bar near the end. Their chin and throat feathers are buff-brown and sometimes have faint barring. Their underparts are mostly pale buffish with a cinnamon or rusty wash on the sides of the breast and flanks. The flanks, breast, and belly sometimes have very faint barring. Their iris is brown, the orbital ring grayish, the bill black with a paler base, and the legs grayish brown.

== Distribution and habitat ==
The rusty-necked piculet is found along the Rio Guaporé, an Amazon tributary that forms the border between Bolivia's Beni Department and Brazil's Mato Grosso state. It inhabits the seasonally flooded várzea forest there.

=== Movement ===
As far as is known the rusty-necked piculet is a year-round resident throughout its range.

=== Feeding ===
Nothing is known about the rusty-necked piculet's foraging technique or diet.

=== Breeding ===
Nothing is known about the rusty-necked piculet's breeding biology.

=== Vocalization ===
The rusty-necked piculet's vocalizations have not been described.

== Status ==
The IUCN originally assessed the rusty-necked piculet as Near Threatened but in 2012 downlisted it to being of Least Concern. However, it has a very limited range and an unknown population size that is believed to be decreasing. The only identified immediate threat is increasing human settlement along the Rio Guaporé.
