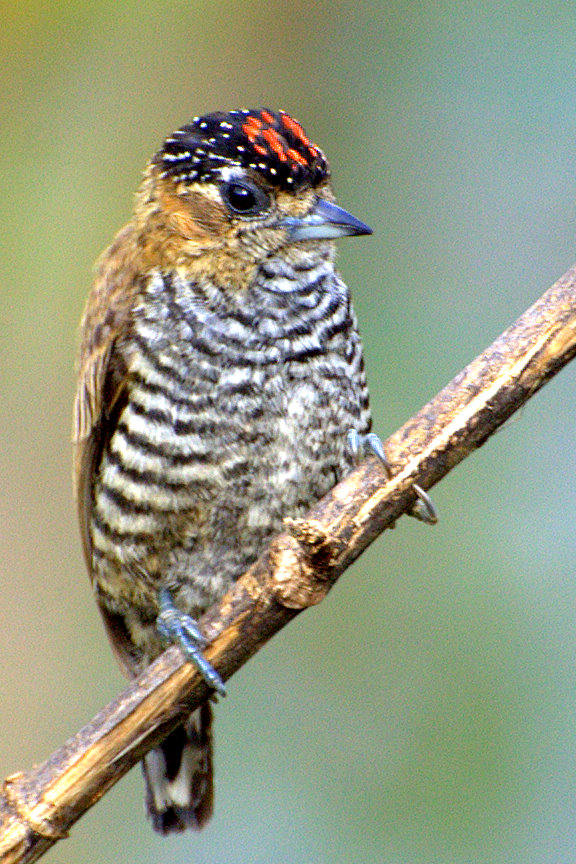
- Male

Conservation status
- Least Concern (IUCN 3.1)

Scientific classification
- Kingdom: Animalia
- Phylum: Chordata
- Class: Aves
- Order: Piciformes
- Family: Picidae
- Genus: Picumnus
- Species: P. temminckii

Binomial name
- Picumnus temminckii Lafresnaye, 1845

= Ochre-collared piculet =

Species of woodpecker

The ochre-collared piculet (Picumnus temminckii) is a species of bird in subfamily Picumninae of the woodpecker family Picidae. It is found in Argentina, Brazil, and Paraguay.

== Taxonomy and systematics ==
The ochre-collared piculet is monotypic. However, the species' taxonomy and that of genus Picnumnus in general are uncertain. The ochre-collared piculet is closely related to the white-barred piculet (P. cirratus) and the ocellated piculet (P. dorbignyanus) and at times these species have been treated as synonymous. It frequently hybridizes with the white-barred piculet and occasionally with the white-wedged piculet (P. albosquamatus).

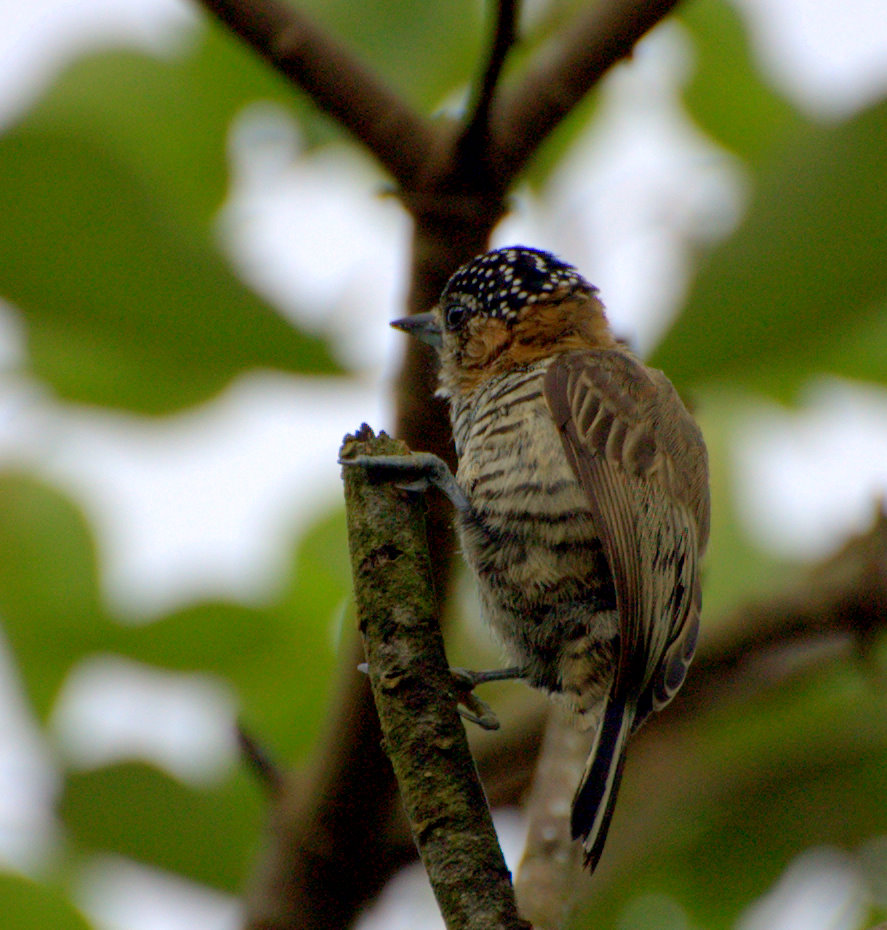
Female

== Description ==
The ochre-collared piculet is 9 to 10 cm (3.5 to 3.9 in) long and weighs 10 to 12.5 g (0.35 to 0.44 oz). Adult males have a black cap with red tips on the forehead feathers and small white spots on the rest of the cap. Their face is mostly rich buff-brown with a white stripe behind the eye. Their hindneck has the cinnamon-buff collar that provides its English name. Their upperparts are brown, sometimes with very faint paler bars. Their flight feathers are dark brown with narrow buff edges. Their tail is blackish; the innermost pair of feather have mostly white inner webs and the outer two pairs have a white patch near the end. Their chin and throat feathers are pale buffish white with narrow blackish edges. Their underparts are mostly whitish with buff on the flanks and lower belly. Their iris is brown, the orbital ring grayish, the bill black with a grayish base, and the legs grayish. Adult females are identical but for no red on the forehead. Juveniles are duller and darker than adults and have heavier but more diffuse barring on the underparts.

== Distribution and habitat ==
The ochre-collared piculet is found from southeastern Brazil's São Paulo state south through eastern Paraguay into northeastern Argentina's Misiones Province. It mostly inhabits lowland rainforest with bamboos, vines, and tangled growth, but it is also found in secondary growth, thickets, tall scrub, and parks and gardens. In elevation it ranges from sea level to 800 m (2,600 ft).

== Behavior ==
=== Movement ===
As far as is known the ochre-collared piculet is a year-round resident throughout its range.

=== Feeding ===
The ochre-collared piculet forages on thin branches, usually low in the forest. Its diet has not been well studied but is known to include ants and insect larvae.

=== Breeding ===
The ochre-collared piculet's breeding season appears to include at least October through December. One nest in São Paulo State, Brazil, was a hole 2.5 m (8 ft) above the ground and a male was seen attending it. Nothing else is known about the species' breeding biology.

=== Vocalization ===
One ochre-collared piculet vocalization is a "[h]igh-pitched whistle, 'tsirrrr, si-si-si...'." Another is "a dry, toneless trill 'trrrrrruh'."

== Status ==
The IUCN has assessed the ochre-collared piculet as being of Least Concern. It has a very large range, but its population size and trend are not known. No immediate threats have been identified. It occurs in several national parks and is considered at least locally common.
