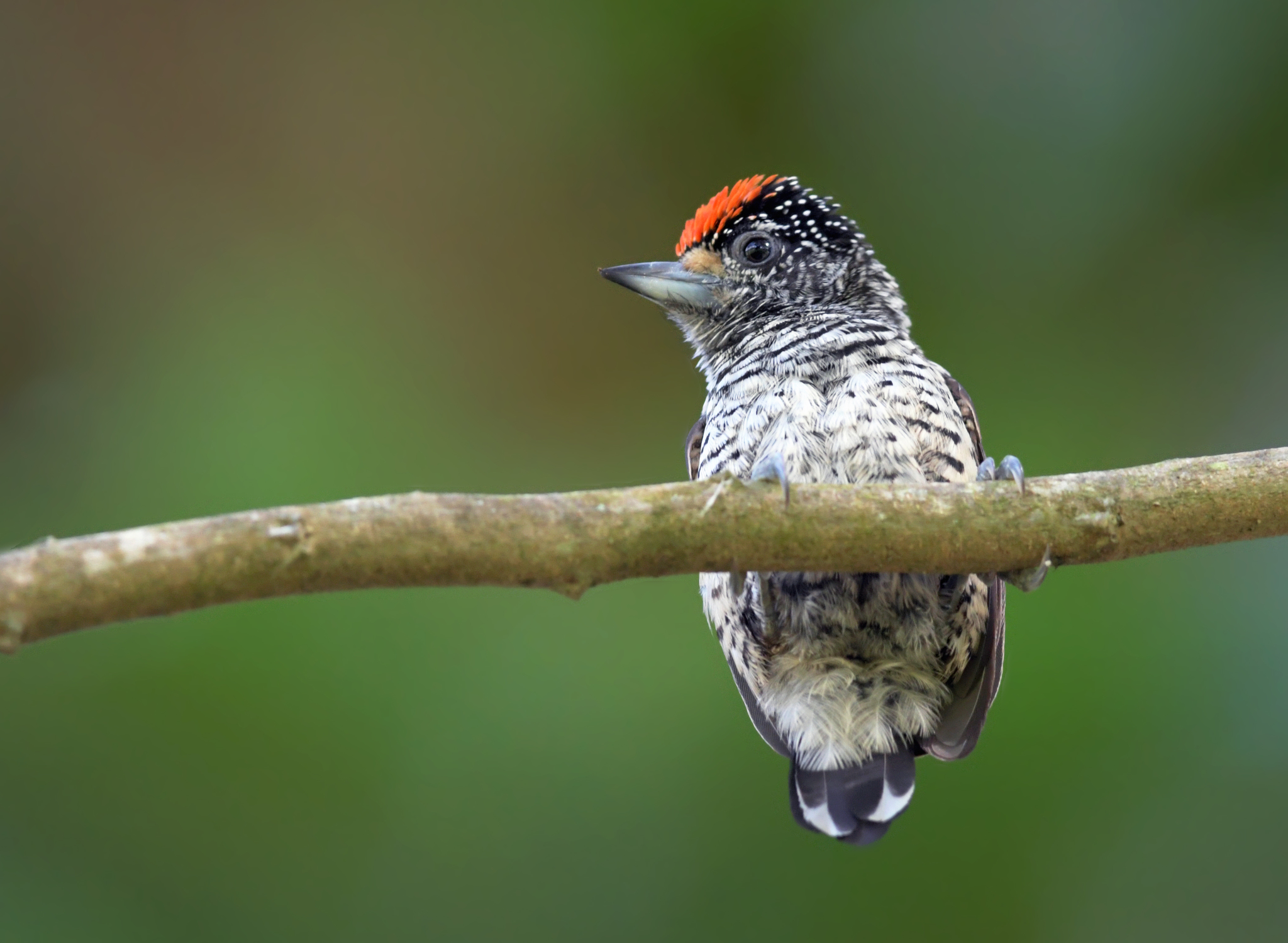
- Picumnus spilogaster in Guyana

Conservation status
- Least Concern (IUCN 3.1)

Scientific classification
- Kingdom: Animalia
- Phylum: Chordata
- Class: Aves
- Order: Piciformes
- Family: Picidae
- Genus: Picumnus
- Species: P. spilogaster

Binomial name
- Picumnus spilogaster Sundevall, 1866

= White-bellied piculet =

Species of woodpecker

The white-bellied piculet (Picumnus spilogaster) is a Vulnerable species of bird in subfamily Picumninae of the woodpecker family Picidae. It is found in Brazil, Guyana, and Venezuela.

== Taxonomy and systematics ==
The white-bellied piculet has these three subspecies:

- P. s. orinocensis Zimmer, J.T. & Phelps, W.H., 1950
- P. s. spilogaster Sundevall, 1866
- P. s. pallidus Snethlage, E., 1924

The species was at one time known as P. leucogaster and has also sometimes been treated as a synonym of the arrowhead piculet (P. minutissimus). Subspecies P. s. pallidus has been treated as a separate species and also as a subspecies of the arrowhead piculet. What is now the black-dotted piculet (P. nigropunctatus) has sometimes been treated as a subspecies of the white-bellied.

== Description ==
The white-bellied piculet is 8 to 9.2 cm (3.1 to 3.6 in) long and weighs 7 to 12 g (0.25 to 0.42 oz). Adult males of the nominate subspecies P. s. spilogaster have a black cap with a red patch on the forehead and white spots on the rest of it. Their face is mostly dark brown with white tips on some feathers. Their upperparts are olive brown with diffuse pale grayish barring. Their flight feathers are brown with light buff edges, especially on the secondaries and tertials. Their tail is dark brown; the innermost pair of feathers have mostly white inner webs and the outer two pairs have mostly white outer webs. Their chin, throat, and sides of the neck feathers are whitish with blackish bars. Their upper breast is pale yellowish buff with broad black bars and the lower breast and belly are creamy white with wide black spots. Adult females are identical but for no red on the forehead. Juveniles are more heavily barred than adults and have buffier underparts.

Subspecies P. s. orinocensis has mostly plain underparts, sometimes with vermiculation on the flanks. P. s. pallidus is essentially the same as the nominate but slightly smaller with a shorter tail.

== Distribution and habitat ==
The nominate subspecies of white-bellied piculet is found in northern Guyana and northern Brazil's state of Roraima. P. s. orinocensis is found in central Venezuela along the Rio Meta and Rio Orinoco. P. s. pallidus is found in the Belém area of Brazil's Pará state. The species inhabits a variety of wooded landscapes including rainforest, gallery forest, deciduous forest, mangroves, and open woodland. In elevation it ranges from near sea level to about 100 m (330 ft).

== Behavior ==
=== Movement ===
As far as is known, the white-bellied piculet is a year-round resident throughout its range.

=== Feeding ===
The white-bellied piculet has been observed feeding in pairs but nothing is known about its foraging technique or diet.

=== Breeding ===
The white-bellied piculet's breeding season is probably from September to November, but nothing else is known about its breeding biology.

=== Vocalization ===
The white-bellied piculet's vocalization is a very high to extremely high "descending, shivering, slow trill."

== Status ==
The IUCN originally assessed the white-bellied piculet as being of Least Concern but since 2012 has rated it as Vulnerable. The primary threat is deforestation for agriculture and ranching.
