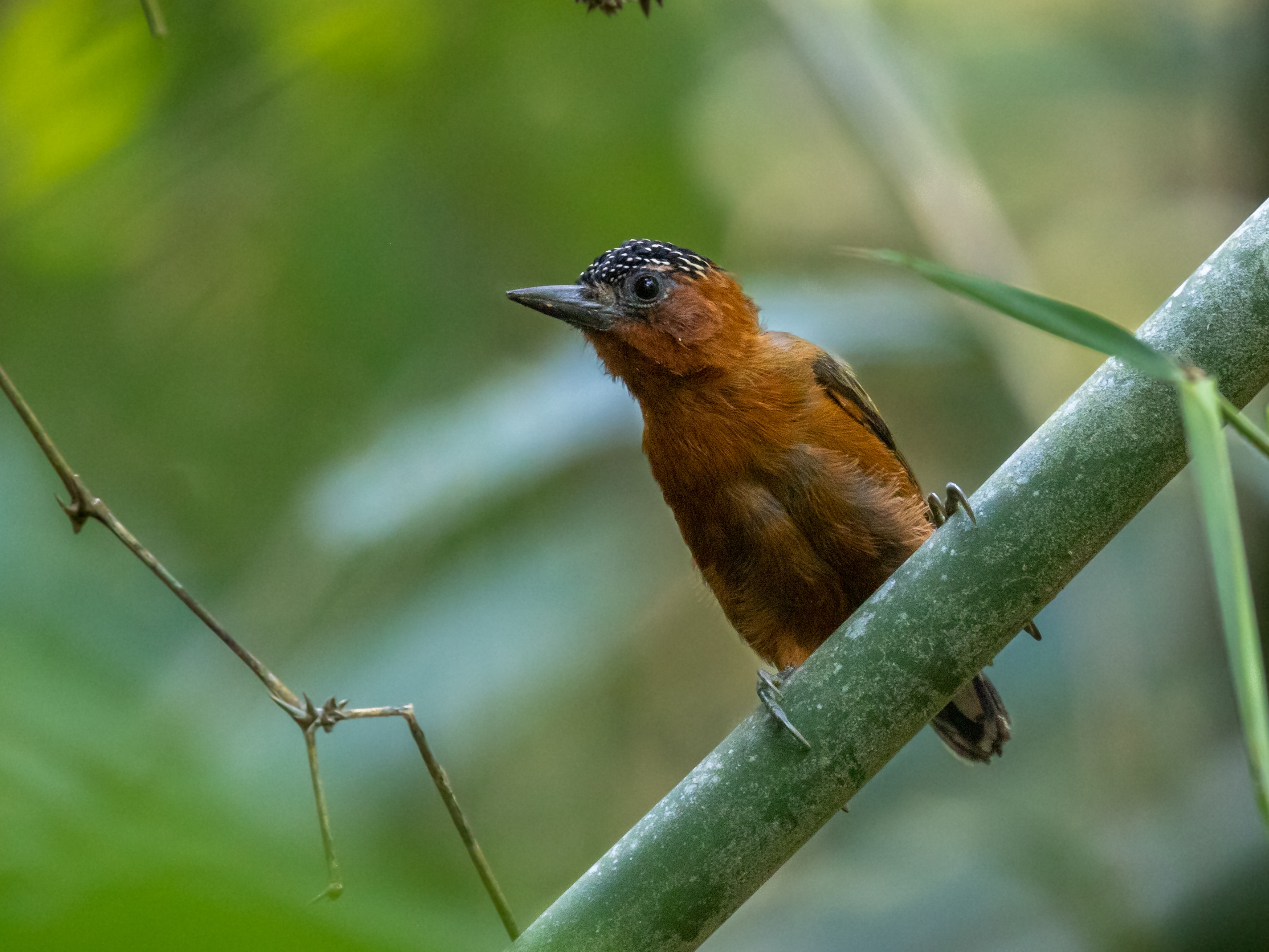
- female

Conservation status
- Least Concern (IUCN 3.1)

Scientific classification
- Kingdom: Animalia
- Phylum: Chordata
- Class: Aves
- Order: Piciformes
- Family: Picidae
- Genus: Picumnus
- Species: P. rufiventris

Binomial name
- Picumnus rufiventris (Bonaparte, 1838)

= Rufous-breasted piculet =

Species of woodpecker

The rufous-breasted piculet (Picumnus rufiventris) is a species of bird in subfamily Picumninae of the woodpecker family Picidae. It is found in Bolivia, Brazil, Colombia, Ecuador, and Peru.

== Taxonomy and systematics ==
The rufous-breasted piculet has three subspecies, the nominate P. r. rufiventris, P. r. grandis (Carriker, 1930), and P. r. brunneifrons (Stager, 1968).

== Description ==
The rufous-breasted piculet is 9 to 11 cm (3.5 to 4.3 in) long and weighs 12 to 21 g (0.42 to 0.74 oz). Adult males of the nominate subspecies have a black crown with wide red tips on most of the feathers and small white to buff spots on its sides and rear border. Their face, a narrow collar on their nape, and their underparts are rich orange rufous or rufous chestnut. Their upperparts are yellowish olive. Their flight feathers are dark with yellowish olive edges. Their tail is black; the innermost pair of feather have mostly white inner webs and pale buff tips, and the outer pairs have a wide buff stripe near the end. Their chin and throat feathers are pale buffish white with narrow blackish edges. Their iris is brown, the bill blackish, and the legs gray. Adult females are identical except for white dots throughout the crown instead of any red. Juveniles are duller than adults and have a brown crown with narrow buff edges to the feathers.

Subspecies P. r. grandis is about 15% larger than the nominate. It is more yellowish above and paler below; its black cap is smaller with more red to the rear and white spots on the front. P. r. brunneifrons is between the other two subspecies in size. Its crown pattern is similar to that of grandis but darker. The rufous on its nape is wider than that of the nominate.

== Distribution and habitat ==
The nominate subspecies of rufous-breasted piculet is found in southeastern Colombia, eastern Ecuador, western Brazil, and northern Peru. P. r. grandis is found in central and southern Peru and P. r. brunneifrons in northwestern and central Bolivia. The species occurs almost entirely near rivers, usually in the dense undergrowth including bamboo adjoining them but also along the edges of other forest, in dense growth along roads, and in small gardens.

== Behavior ==
=== Feeding ===
The rufous-breasted piculet usually forages within about 3 m (10 ft) of the ground. It typically forages alone, in pairs, or as part of a mixed species foraging flock. It clings to bamboo stalks and small branches, sometimes upside down, and pecks and probes the bark. Its diet has not been detailed but is known to include insects.

=== Breeding ===
The rufous-breasted piculet breeds between January and March in Bolivia and Peru and apparently later in Ecuador. Nothing else is known about its breeding biology.

=== Vocalization ===
The rufous-breasted piculet's song is "a slow, descending series of high, lisping notes (generally 2): seep seep." Its calls include "single quick seep notes or a rapid tsit tsit in flight."

== Status ==
The IUCN has assessed the rufous-breasted piculet as being of Least Concern. It has a very large range, and though its population size is not known it is believed to be stable. No immediate threats have been identified. It is considered from uncommon and local to fairly common in different parts of its range. "Human activity has little short-term direct effect on the Rufous-breasted Piculet, other than the local effects of habitat destruction."
