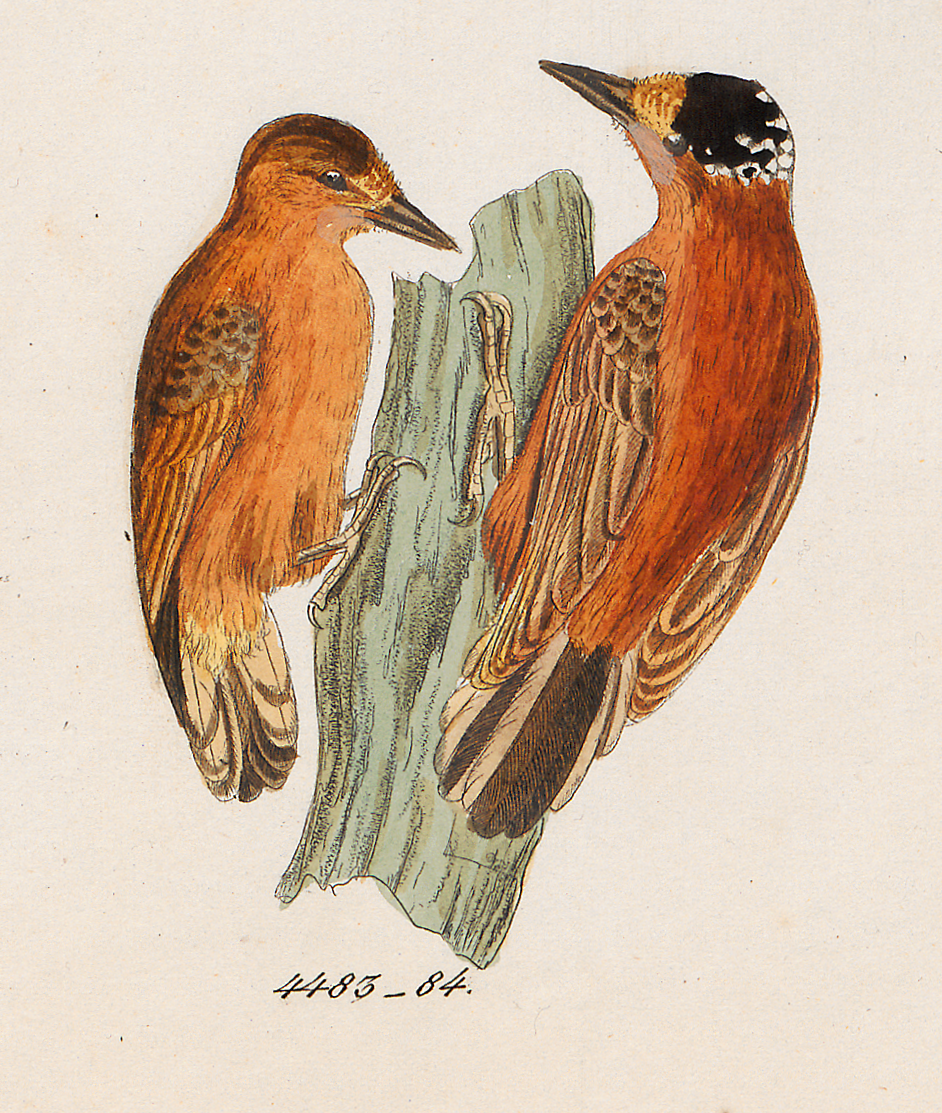

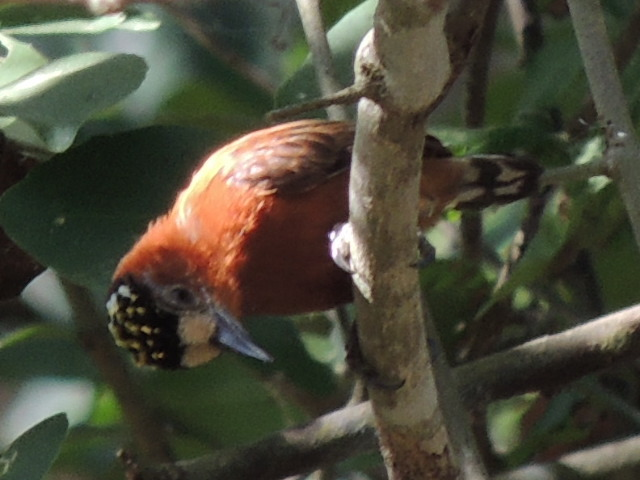

Conservation status
- Least Concern (IUCN 3.1)

Scientific classification
- Kingdom: Animalia
- Phylum: Chordata
- Class: Aves
- Order: Piciformes
- Family: Picidae
- Genus: Picumnus
- Species: P. cinnamomeus

Binomial name
- Picumnus cinnamomeus Wagler, 1829

= Chestnut piculet =

Species of woodpecker

The chestnut piculet (Picumnus cinnamomeus) is a species of bird in subfamily Picumninae of the woodpecker family Picidae. It is found in Colombia and Venezuela.

== Taxonomy and systematics ==
The International Ornithological Committee assigns the chestnut piculet these four subspecies:

- P. c. cinnamomeus Wagler, 1829
- P. c. perijanus Zimmer, J.T. & Phelps, W.H., 1944
- P. c. persaturatus Haffer, 1961
- P. c. venezuelensis Cory, 1913

BirdLife International's Handbook of the Birds of the World and the Clements taxonomy split a fifth subspecies, P. c. larensis (Aveledo, 1998), from P. c. venezuelensis.

This article follows the four-subspecies model.

== Description ==
The chestnut piculet is 9 to 10 cm (3.5 to 3.9 in) long. Adult males of the nominate subspecies P. c. cinnamomeus have a pale creamy forehead, a black crown with yellow-tipped feathers, and a black nape with white-tipped feathers. The rest of their body is deep rufous to rusty brown, with the rump and belly being a bit paler than the rest. Their wings are dark brown with cinnamon to rufous edges and tips to the feathers. Their tail is brownish black; the innermost pair of feathers have a cinnamon stripe on the inner webs and the outer two pairs a cinnamon stripe on the outer webs. Their iris is brown, the beak blackish, the bare skin around the eye yellow, and the legs gray. Adult females are identical but with no yellow on the crown and white spots only on the hindcrown and nape.

Subspecies P. c. persaturatus is a richer and darker chestnut than the nominate, and has brighter wing edging and less defined chestnut stripes on the tail. Its females have white spots on their entire crown. P. c. perijanus is similar to persaturatus but a little lighter, and the female's crown spotting is heavier. P. c. venezuelensis is as dark as persaturatus but with a cinnamon-tawny forehead, and the female has white spots only on the crown, not the nape.

== Distribution and habitat ==
The subspecies of the chestnut piculet are found thus:

- P. c. cinnamomeus, coastal northern Colombia south into the lower Cauca River and Magdalena River valleys and east slightly into Venezuela's Guajira Peninsula
- P. c. perijanus, the northern basin of northwestern Venezuela's Lake Maracaibo
- P. c. persaturatus, Serranía de San Jerónimo in northwestern Colombia's Bolívar Department
- P. c. venezuelensis, Venezuela in the south and eastern Lake Maracaibo basin and ("larensis") into the departments of Falcón and Lara

The chestnut piculet inhabits a wide variety of landscapes including rainforest, deciduous forest, open areas with scattered trees, arid and semi-arid scrublands, mangroves, and coffee plantations. Thorny woodlands appear to be its favorite. In elevation it occurs from sea level to 100 m (330 ft) in Venezuela and to 300 m (980 ft) in Colombia.

== Behavior ==
=== Movement ===
The chestnut piculet is a year-round resident throughout its range.

=== Feeding ===
The chestnut piculet forages actively at all levels of it habitat but tends to stay in dense vegetation. It is typically seen singly, in pairs, or in small family groups and joins mixed species foraging flocks. Its diet has not been studied but is assumed to be ants and other small insects.

=== Breeding ===
The chestnut piculet's breeding season appears to include at least from December to March, but nothing else is known about its breeding biology.

=== Vocalization ===
The chestnut piculet's song is "a series of 3-8 high-pitched notes ti.ti.ti.ti.ti descending in pitch".

== Status ==
The IUCN has assessed the chestnut piculet as being of Least Concern, though its population size and trend are not known. No immediate threats have been identified. It is considered common in Colombia but has few records in Venezuela. "Considering that this species is not so inconspicuous as most other piculets, it is rather poorly known."
