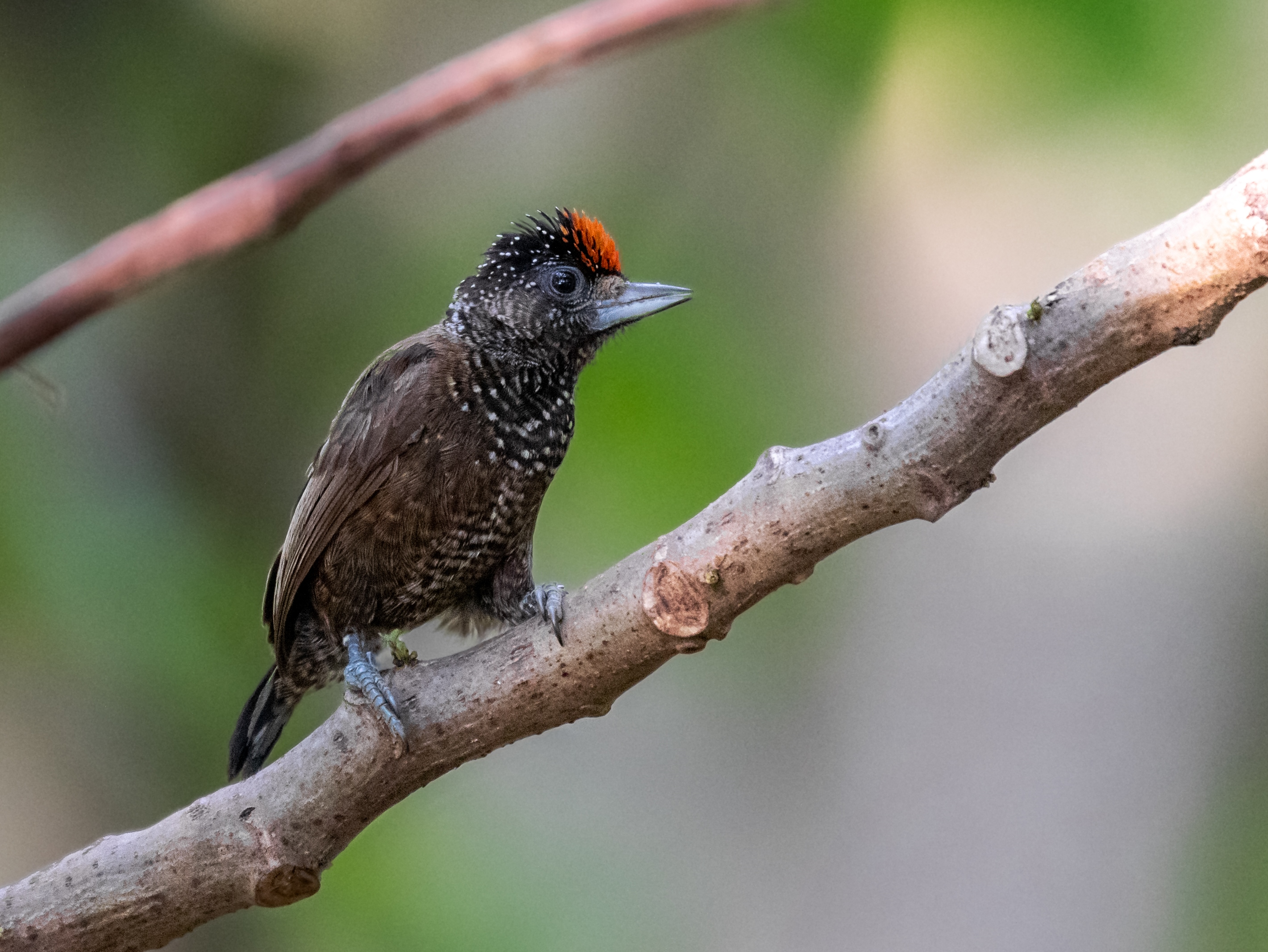
- male
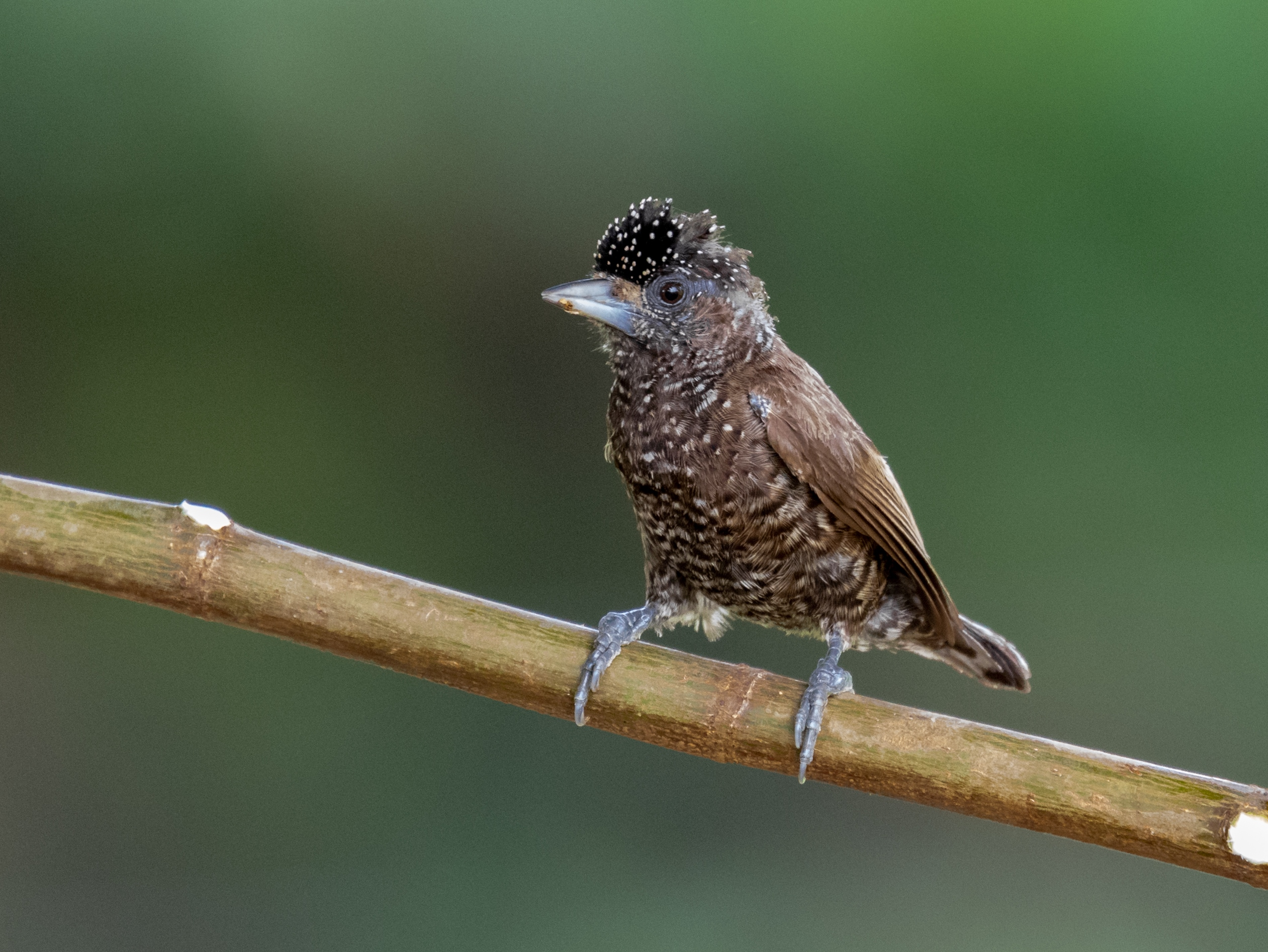
- female

Conservation status
- Near Threatened (IUCN 3.1)

Scientific classification
- Kingdom: Animalia
- Phylum: Chordata
- Class: Aves
- Order: Piciformes
- Family: Picidae
- Genus: Picumnus
- Species: P. varzeae

Binomial name
- Picumnus varzeae Snethlage, 1912

= Varzea piculet =

Species of woodpecker

The varzea piculet (Picumnus varzeae) is a Near Threatened species of bird in subfamily Picumninae of the woodpecker family Picidae. It is endemic to Brazil's Amazon basin.

== Taxonomy and systematics ==
The varzea piculet was first described in 1912 by the German-Brazilian ornithologist Emilie Snethlage who collected birds in Brazil for two decades.

At least one author has suggested that the varzea piculet might be a subspecies of the spotted piculet (P. pygmaeus). It occasionally hybridizes with the white-barred piculet (P. cirratus).

The specific epithet refers to "várzea", the Brazilian name for the seasonally flooded forest close to the Amazon River.

The varzea piculet is monotypic.

== Description ==
The varzea piculet is 8 to 9 cm (3.1 to 3.5 in) long. Adult males have a black cap with a red patch on the forehead and top and white spots on the hindcrown and nape. Their face is mostly dark brown with black and white tips on some feathers. Their upperparts are mostly dark olive brown to greenish brown, sometimes with faint black bars. Their flight feathers are dark brown with pale edges and tips on the secondaries and tertials. Their tail is dark brown; the innermost pair of feathers have mostly white inner webs and the outer two pairs have a narrow white band near the end. Their chin and throat are black-brown with fine white markings. Their underparts are variable but usually brown or greenish brown with black and white feather tips that show in rows. Their iris is brown, the beak is black with a blue-gray base, and the legs and feet are gray. Adult females are identical but for no red on the head. Juveniles are similar to adults but have more barring on their underparts.

== Distribution and habitat ==
The varzea piculet is found along the Amazon River from the Rio Negro in the state of Amazonas to the Rio Tapajós in western Pará; the corridor is about 850 km (530 mi) long and up to about 275 km (170 mi). It inhabits dense undergrowth in várzea, a seasonally flooded landscape that is mostly forest but includes grasslands and river islands.

== Behavior ==
=== Movement ===
As far as is known the varzea piculet is a year-round resident throughout its range.

=== Feeding ===
Nothing is known about the varzea piculet's foraging technique or diet.

=== Breeding ===
The varzea piculet's breeding season is poorly known but may be from June to December; young birds have been recorded in September. Nothing else is known about its breeding biology.

=== Vocalization ===
As of early 2023 xeno-canto had only five recordings of the varzea piculet's song. The Cornell Lab of Ornithology's Macaulay Library had seven with some overlap with xeno-canto. The song has not been transcribed.

== Status ==
The IUCN originally assessed the varzea piculet as being of Least Concern, then in 2012 as Endangered, and then in 2022 downlisted it to Near Threatened. It has a small range and its population size is not known and believed to be decreasing. The primary immediate threat is clearance of the forest for cattle grazing. A potential longer term threat are two hydroelectric dams upstream of its range which might alter the downstream hydrology. Brazilian authorities consider it Endangered. "Data [are] urgently required on this species' ecology and breeding biology."
