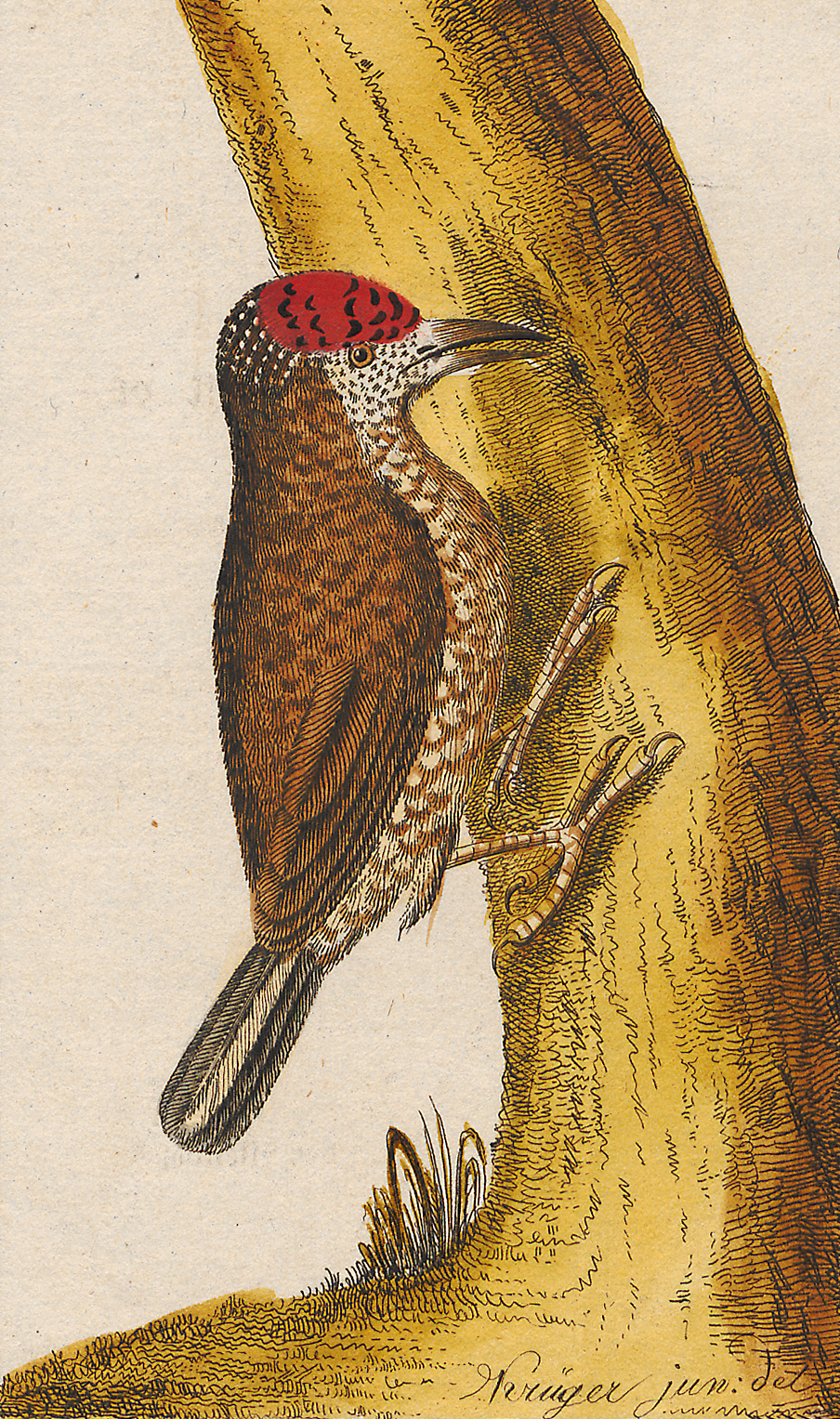

Conservation status
- Least Concern (IUCN 3.1)

Scientific classification
- Kingdom: Animalia
- Phylum: Chordata
- Class: Aves
- Order: Piciformes
- Family: Picidae
- Genus: Picumnus
- Species: P. minutissimus

Binomial name
- Picumnus minutissimus (Pallas, 1782)

= Arrowhead piculet =

Species of woodpecker

The arrowhead piculet or Guianan piculet (Picumnus minutissimus) is a species of bird in subfamily Picumninae of the woodpecker family Picidae. It is found in Suriname and possibly French Guiana and Guyana.

== Taxonomy and systematics ==
The arrowhead piculet is monotypic. However, subspecies P. spilogaster pallidus of the white-bellied piculet has been considered a subspecies of arrowhead. The white-bellied as a whole has also at times been treated as a synonym of the arrowhead piculet.

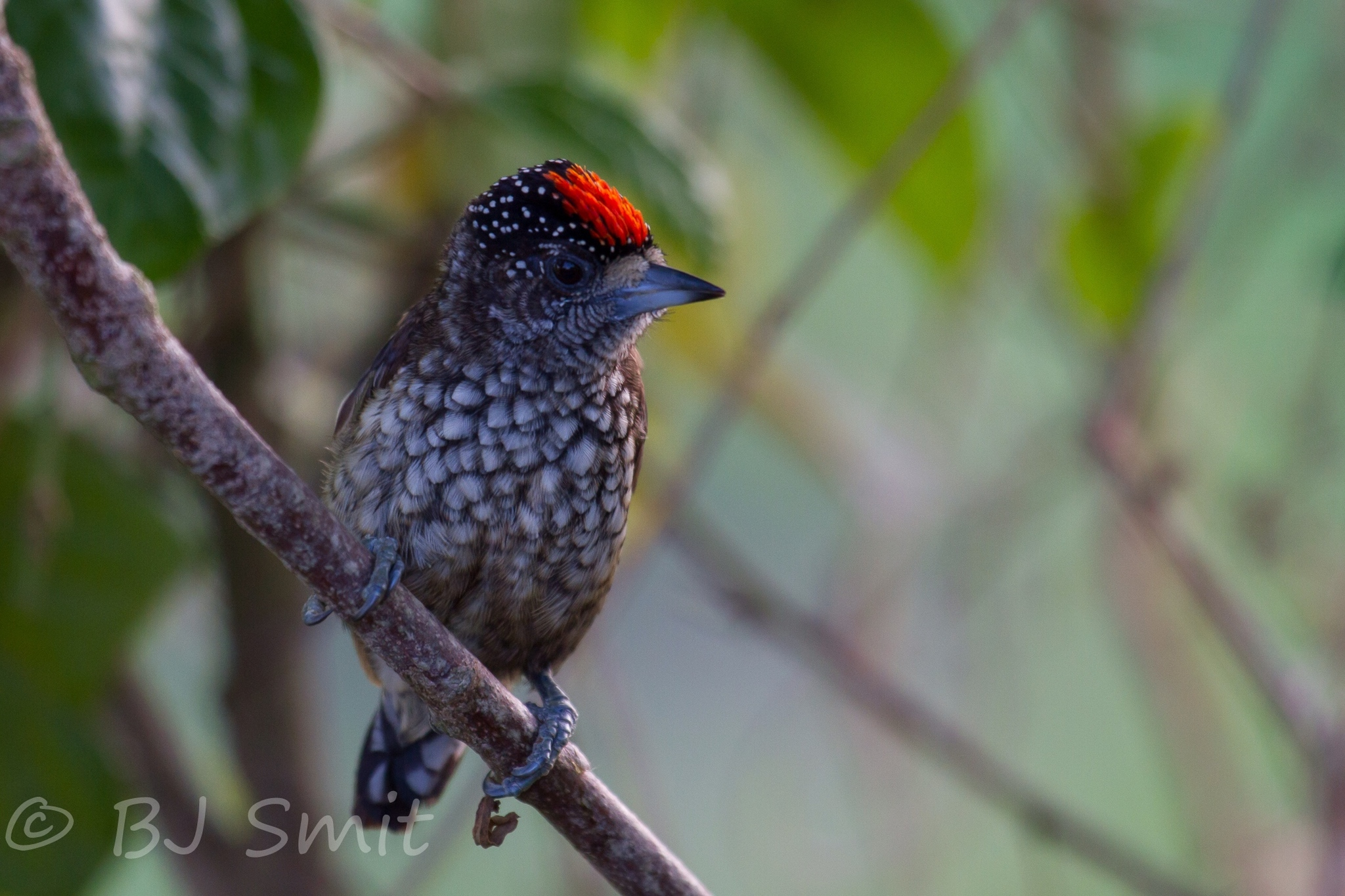
On branch

== Description ==
The arrowhead piculet is 9 to 10 cm (3.5 to 3.9 in) long and weighs 11 to 16 g (0.39 to 0.56 oz). Adult males have a black cap with a red patch on the forehead and white spots on the rest of it. Their face is mostly dark brown with white tips on some feathers and a white line behind the eye. Their upperparts are olive brown whose feathers have blackish wedge-shaped centers, a very thin black bar at their tip, and a white spot just inside the tip. Their rump is plainer but their undertail coverts can have dark bars. Their flight feathers are brown with light buffy edges, especially on the secondaries and tertials. Their tail is brownish black; the innermost pair of feathers have mostly white inner webs and the outer two pairs have a white stripe on the outer webs. Their chin, throat, and sides of the neck are whitish with blackish bars. Their underparts are white with a brownish buff tinge on the belly and flanks; the underparts' feathers have brownish black fringes that give a scaly appearance. Adult females are identical but for no red on the forehead. Juveniles have a plain brown crown; their upperparts are browner than the adults' and have blackish bars. Their underparts are duller with a more obscure pattern.

== Distribution and habitat ==
The South American Classification Committee of the American Ornithological Society considers the arrowhead piculet to be endemic to Suriname with no records elsewhere. The Clements taxonomy adds that it is "possibly also in adjacent Guyana and French Guiana". The International Ornithological Committee lists it simply in the Guianas. Despite its rather small range, it inhabits a wide variety of landscapes, from mangroves, secondary forest, plantations, gallery forest to montane forest.

== Behavior ==
=== Movement ===
The arrowhead piculet is a year-round resident.

=== Feeding ===
The arrowhead piculet's diet has not been fully described but is known to include ants and small beetles. It forages somewhat like a chickadee, hanging from twigs and small branches and hammering on them.

=== Breeding ===
The arrowhead piculet's breeding season is from March to December. Males excavate a nest hole with some contribution by the female, placing it as high as 8 m (26 ft) above the ground. The clutch size is two or three eggs. Both parents incubate the eggs for 12 to 14 days and both provision nestlings. Fledging occurs about 28 days after hatch.

=== Vocalization ===
The arrowhead piculet makes a "[s]eries of c. 14 thin notes, 'it-it-it-it...', or 'kee kee kee'." It also makes a "loud twitter" during agonistic encounters.

== Status ==
The IUCN originally assessed the arrowhead piculet as being of Least Concern, then in 2012 uplisted it to Near Threatened, and then in 2019 again rated it of Least Concern. Though it has a limited range and an unknown population size, the latter is believed to be stable. Deforestation does pose a threat.
