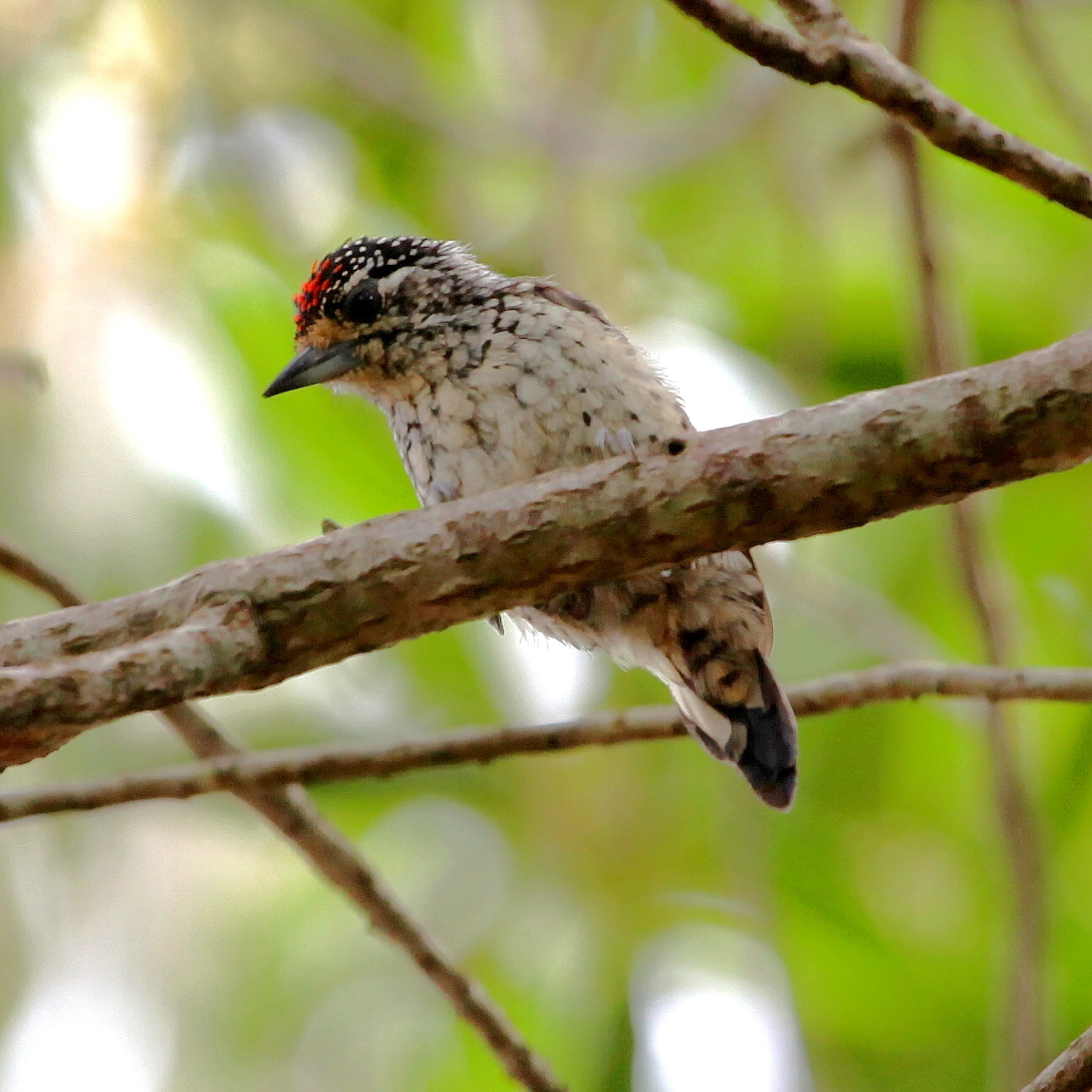
- Male at Bonito, Mato Grosso do Sul State, Brazil

Conservation status
- Least Concern (IUCN 3.1)

Scientific classification
- Kingdom: Animalia
- Phylum: Chordata
- Class: Aves
- Order: Piciformes
- Family: Picidae
- Genus: Picumnus
- Species: P. albosquamatus

Binomial name
- Picumnus albosquamatus D'Orbigny, 1840

= White-wedged piculet =

Species of woodpecker

The white-wedged piculet (Picumnus albosquamatus) is a species of bird in subfamily Picumninae of the woodpecker family Picidae. It is found in Argentina, Bolivia, Brazil and Paraguay.

== Taxonomy and systematics ==
The white-wedged piculet has two subspecies, the nominate P. a. albosquamatus and P. a. guttifer (Sundevall, 1866). P. a. guttifer has at times been treated as a separate species but intergrades and hybridizes with the nominate. The white-wedged piculet hybridizes with the white-barred piculet (P. cirratus), the ocellated piculet (P. dorbignyanus), and the ochre-collared piculet (P. temminckii).

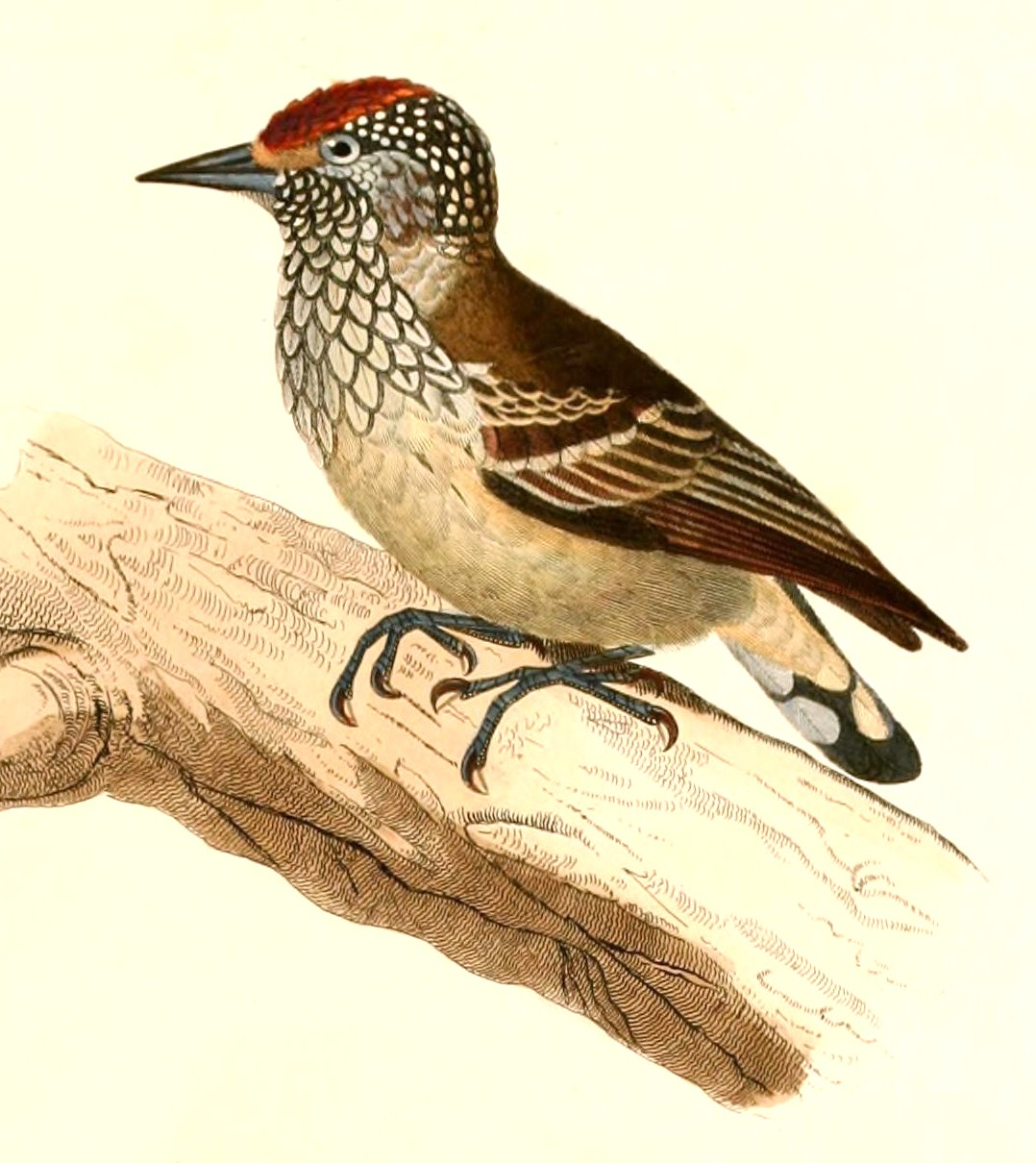
Illustration of male, d'Orbigny 1847

== Description ==
The white-wedged piculet is 10 to 11 cm (3.9 to 4.3 in) long and weighs 9 to 11 g (0.32 to 0.39 oz). Adult males of the nominate subspecies have a black cap with wide red tips on the forehead feathers and small white spots on the rest of the cap. Their face and hindneck are mostly white with a strong brown tinge and a white stripe behind the eye. Their upperparts are warm brown to grayish brown, sometimes with faint pale tips on the feathers. Their flight feathers are dark brown with narrow buffish white edges on the secondaries and tertials. Their tail is dark brown; the innermost pair of feather have mostly white inner webs and the outer two pairs have a wide white patch near the end. Their chin and throat feathers are pale buffish white with black edges that give a scaly appearance. Their underparts are mostly whitish with a pale buff wash; the breast has a scalloped appearance from black feather edges and the belly is plain or slightly streaked. Their iris is brown, the orbital ring grayish, the bill black with a paler base on the mandible, and the legs gray to green-gray. Adult females are identical but for no red on the forehead. Juveniles are duller than adults and their underparts look more barred than scalloped.

Subspecies P. a. guttifer is larger than the nominate. It is usually darker, with more contrast on the face, more of a scalloped pattern on the upperparts, and warm buff underparts with wider black edges on the feathers. The male also has more red on the crown than the nominate.

== Distribution and habitat ==
The nominate subspecies of white-wedged piculet is found in north-central and eastern Bolivia, southwestern Brazil's Mato Grosso state, northern Paraguay, and northwestern Argentina. P. a. guttifer is found in eastern and central Brazil from Pará and Maranhão south to Mato Grosso and São Paulo. The species inhabits denser areas in moderately dry cerrado and also gallery forest. In elevation it ranges from the lowlands to as high as 2,100 m (6,900 ft).

== Behavior ==
=== Movement ===
As far as is known the white-wedged piculet is a year-round resident throughout its range.

=== Feeding ===
Little is known about the white-wedged piculet's foraging technique or diet, but data from the northern Pantanal in Brazil suggests that they eat exclusively ants.

=== Breeding ===
The white-wedged piculet's breeding season has not been detailed but appears to be concentrated in the second half of the year. It nests in holes; some have been noted in tree branches and at least one in a fence post. The clutch size is at least two eggs and both parents provision nestlings. The incubation period and time to fledging are not known.

=== Vocalization ===
The white-wedged piculet makes a "high-pitched trill, slightly rising at first and then falling gradually in pitch 'tititititititititititi'."

== Status ==
The IUCN has assessed the white-wedged piculet as being of Least Concern. It has a large range, but its population size is not known and is believed to be decreasing. No immediate threats have been identified. It occurs in three Brazilian national parks, and in other areas such as the northern Pantanal is considered "locally not uncommon".
