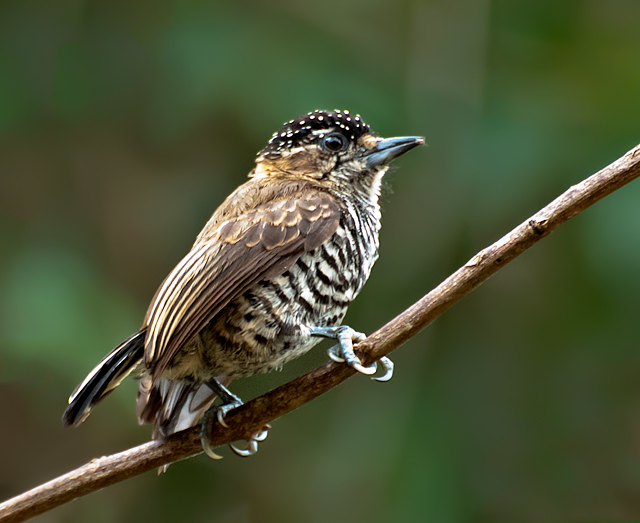

Conservation status
- Least Concern (IUCN 3.1)

Scientific classification
- Kingdom: Animalia
- Phylum: Chordata
- Class: Aves
- Order: Piciformes
- Family: Picidae
- Genus: Picumnus
- Species: P. cirratus

Binomial name
- Picumnus cirratus Temminck, 1825

= White-barred piculet =

Species of woodpecker

The white-barred piculet (Picumnus cirratus) is a species of bird in the woodpecker family Picidae. It is found in Argentina, Bolivia, Brazil, French Guiana, Guyana, Paraguay, and Uruguay.

== Taxonomy and systematics ==
The white-barred piculet was first described in 1825 by the Dutch zoologist Coenraad Jacob Temminck. Six subspecies are recognized:

- P. c. macconnelli Sharpe, 1901
- P. c. confusus Kinnear, 1927
- P. c. cirratus Temminck, 1825
- P. c. pilcomayensis Hargitt, 1891
- P. c. tucumanus Hartert, E.J.O., 1909
- P. c. thamnophiloides Bond, J. & Meyer de Schauensee, 1942

The white-barred piculet's taxonomy and that of genus Picumnus in general are uncertain. Molecular studies show that it is a sister species to the ochre-collared piculet (P. temminckii) and also closely related to the ocellated piculet (P. dorbignyanus), and at different times these species have been treated as synonymous. Subspecies pilcomayensis, thamnophiloides, and tucumanus intergrade in northern Argentina and are sometimes considered a separate species. Subspecies pilcomayensis and cirratus intergrade in eastern Paraguay. Subspecies confusus and macconnelli may also form a distinct species. The white-barred piculet also hybridizes widely with several other species of piculet where their ranges overlap; these include the varzea (P. varzeae) along the Amazon River, the ochre-collared in southeastern Brazil, and the ocellated and the white-wedged piculet (P. albosquamatus) in Bolivia.

The specific epithet cirratus means "curly headed", cirrus being Latin for a ringlet or curl.

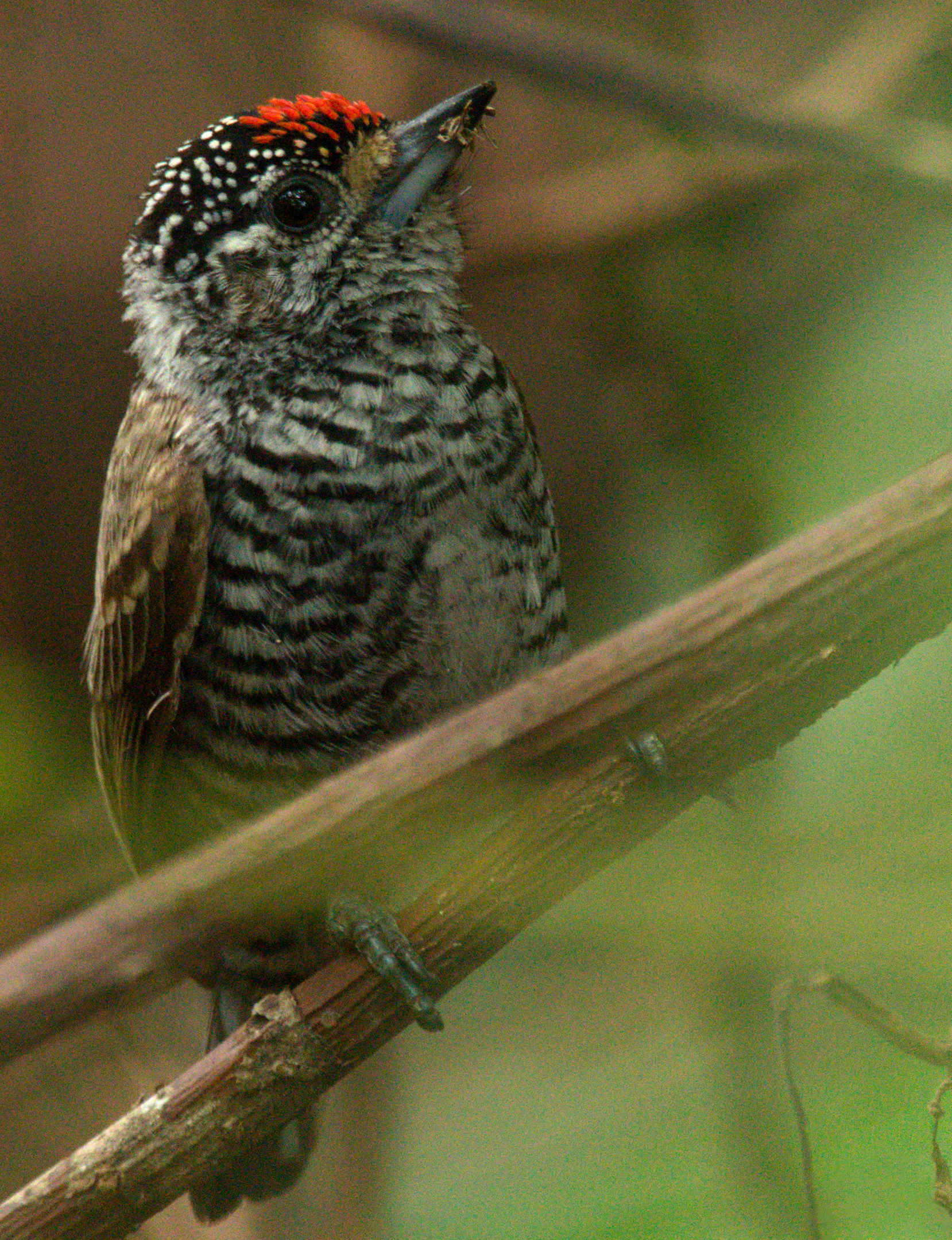
Picumnus cirratus (male) in the Botanical Garden of Asunción, Paraguay

== Description ==
The white-barred piculet is about 10 cm (3.9 in) long and weighs 6.3 to 12 g (0.22 to 0.42 oz). Adult males of the nominate subspecies P. c. cirratus have a black cap with a red patch on the forehead and white spots on the rest of it. Their face is mostly dark buff-brown with faint blackish bars and a white stripe behind the eye. Their upperparts are dull brownish, sometimes with faint darker bars. Their flight feathers are dark brown with buffish white edges on the secondaries and tertials. Their tail is dark brown; the innermost pair of feathers have mostly white inner webs and the outer two or three pairs have a white patch near the end. Their chin and throat feathers are white to pale buff with blackish bars. The rest of their underparts are white with black barring and a buff tinge to the belly and flanks. Their iris is dark chestnut-brown, the orbital ring blue-gray, the beak black with a pale base to the mandible, and the legs gray. Adult females are identical but with no red on the forehead. Juveniles are duller and darker than adults and have an unspotted crown, more obvious barring on their upperparts, and heavier barring on their underparts.

Subspecies P. c. confusus has a darker face than the nominate with no white line behind the eye, brown upperparts, and a heavily barred throat. P. c. macconnelli is similar to confusus but without barring on its upperparts; its face sometimes has white spots and the throat and breast have heavier barring. P. c. thamnophiloides has grayish upperparts and fewer markings on the underparts except for "arrowheads" on the flanks. P. c. tucumanus has distinctly barred gray-brown upperparts, a buffier throat and breast with more obscure bars than the nominate, and less red to no red on the crown. P. c. pilcomayensis has grayish upperparts, narrow black and white barring on the underparts, and little to no red on the crown.

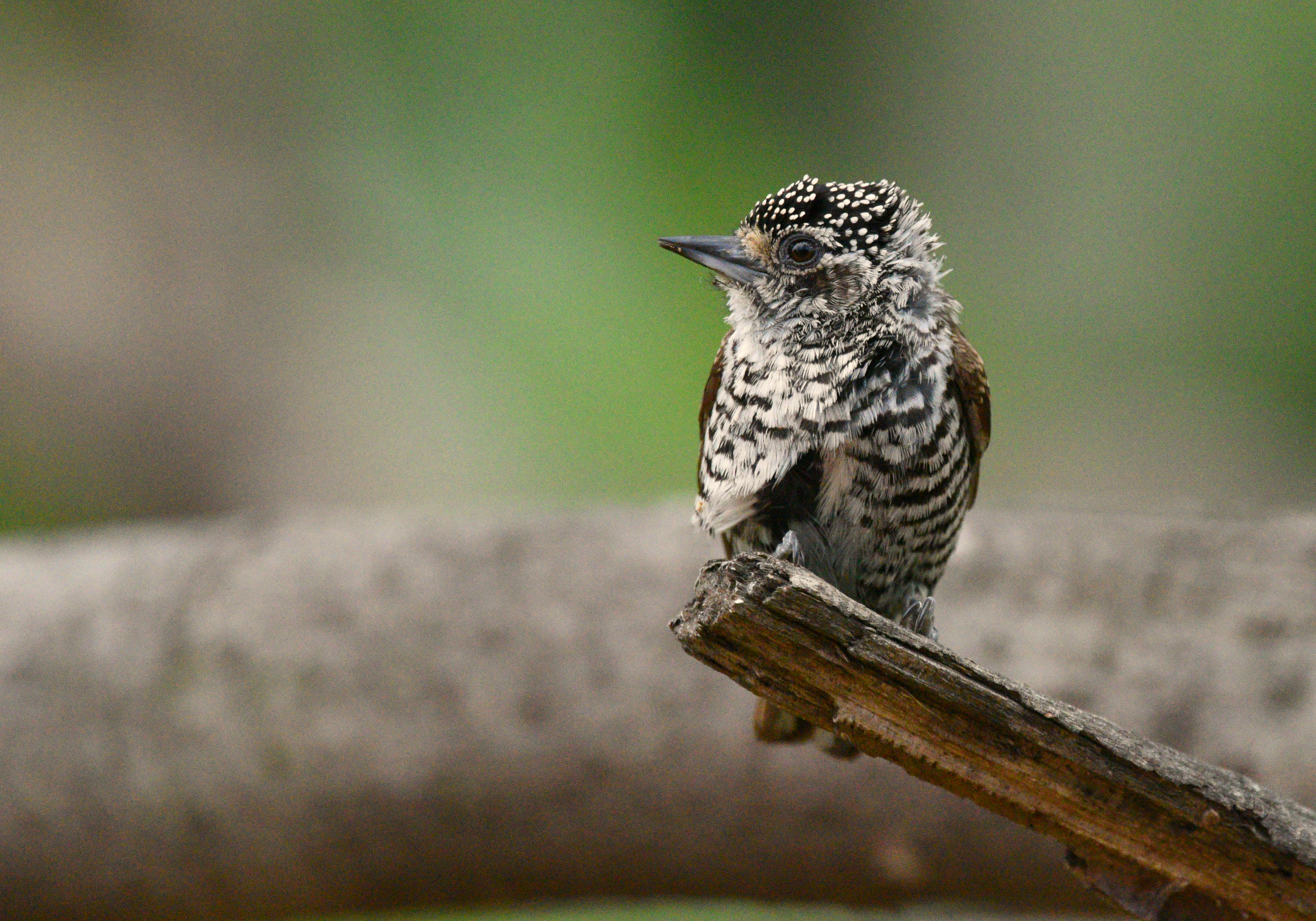
Picumnus cirratus (female) in Asunción, Paraguay

== Distribution and habitat ==
The white-barred piculet has two widely separated ranges. The subspecies are found thus:

- P. c. macconnelli, northeastern Brazil's eastern Amazon Basin west to the Rio Tapajós
- P. c. confusus, southwestern Guyana, French Guiana, and Roraima state in extreme northern Brazil
- P. c. cirratus, southeastern Brazil south from Minas Gerais and Espírito Santo to eastern Paraguay
- P. c. pilcomayensis, from southeastern Bolivia and Paraguay into northeastern Argentina and also Uruguay
- P. c. tucumanus, northwestern Argentina
- P. c. thamnophiloides, southeastern Bolivia to northwestern Argentina

The white-barred piculet inhabits a variety of landscapes including wet and dry woodland, forest edges, thickets, gallery forest in savannah, scrub, bamboo clumps, várzea, and overgrown parks and gardens. In elevation it ranges from near sea level to about 2,100 m (6,900 ft).

== Behavior ==
=== Movement ===
As far as is known the white-barred piculet is a year-round resident throughout its ranges.

=== Feeding ===
The white-barred piculet usually forages singly, but may join small mixed species foraging flocks. It feeds on ants, insect larvae and eggs especially those of wood-boring beetles, and other small invertebrates. It actively drills holes in wood and may also feed on sap that oozes from puncture marks. It mostly feeds on twigs and branch tips but also vines and bamboo, sometimes clinging to the underside.

=== Breeding ===
The white-barred piculet's northern subspecies breed between July and December and the southern ones between September and March. Both sexes excavate a nest hole, usually in a slender tree branch; the height above ground varies but can be as low as 2 m (7 ft). the clutch size is two to four eggs. Both sexes incubate but the incubation period and time to fledging are not known.

=== Vocal and non-vocal sounds ===
The white-breasted piculet's primary vocalization is an "extr. high, dry, fast trill, like 'trrrrriut'." It also makes a "tsirit, tsick" call, and its drumming on dead wood is "a loud staccato".

== Status ==
The IUCN has assessed the white-breasted piculet as being of Least Concern. It has an extremely large range, and though its population size is not known and thought to be decreasing, neither have reached the thresholds for a more critical rating. No immediate threats have been identified. It appears to be fairly common to common in most of its range and occurs in several protected areas. However, it is "locally threatened by continuing deterioration of remnant forest habitat" in areas of urban growth.
