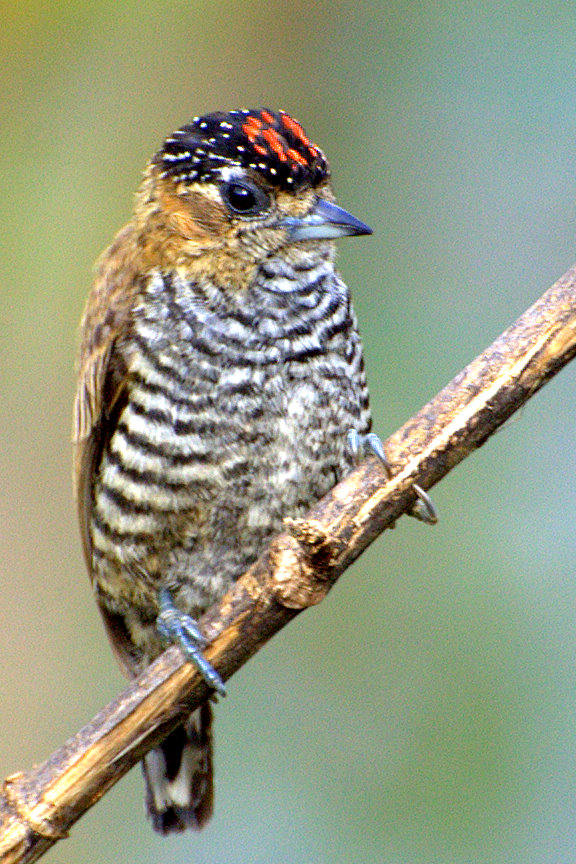
- Ochre-collared piculet, Picumnus temminckii

Scientific classification
- Kingdom: Animalia
- Phylum: Chordata
- Class: Aves
- Order: Piciformes
- Family: Picidae
- Subfamily: Picumninae
- Genus: Picumnus; Temminck, 1825

Type species
- Picumnus minutissimus Temminck, 1825

Species
- See text

= Picumnus (bird) =

Genus of birds

Picumnus is a large genus of piculets. With a total length of 8–10 cm (3–4 in), they are among the smallest birds in the woodpecker family. All species are found in the Neotropics except the speckled piculet (Picumnus innominatus) that has a wide distribution in China, India and Southeast Asia.

Species limits in this genus are doubtful, and the rate of interbreeding is "inordinately high" (Remsen et al. 2007). As defined by Winkler and Christie (2002), it contains the 27 species listed below, all from the Neotropics except the speckled piculet, which is Asian (and sometimes placed in a monotypic genus, Vivia).

Their upperparts are brownish, greyish or olive, in some species with darker barring or white or yellowish spotting on the mantle. The underparts vary greatly among the species, ranging from all rich brown in the chestnut piculet, to whitish in the plain-breasted piculet, white with dark bars in the white-barred piculet, and pale yellowish with dark bars on the chest and dark spots and streaks on the belly in the bar-breasted piculet. They have black crowns with red, orange, or yellow marks in the male and white dots in the female, except that the male speckled piculet has brown crown marks and the female lacks white dots. Most have rather short black tails with white stripes down the edges and the center (Blume and Winkler 2003). In two species, the rufous-breasted and the chestnut piculets, the white is largely replaced by rufous.

While the individual species often are habitat specialists (as evident by a number of highly restricted species such as the rusty-necked and ochraceous piculets), members of this genus range from dry Caatinga woodland to humid Amazonian and Atlantic Forest. They are generally found in pairs or small groups. The Neotropical species fall into two broad song groups, with the first having a song consisting of a long trill, and the second a song consisting of series of two or more descending notes.

== Taxonomy ==
The genus Picumnus was introduced in 1825 by the Dutch zoologist Coenraad Jacob Temminck. He listed three species in the genus but did not specify the type. In 1840 George Gray designated the type as Picumnus minutissimus Temminck, 1825. This is now preoccupied in Picumnus by Picus minutissimus Pallas, 1782. The genus name was coined by Temminck from the French piculet for a little woodpecker.

== Species ==
The genus contains the following 25 species:

Image	Common name	Scientific name	Distribution
	Speckled piculet	Picumnus innominatus	Himalayas, China, Indochina and montane India and Sumatra
	Bar-breasted piculet	Picumnus aurifrons	southern Amazonia
	Lafresnaye's piculet	Picumnus lafresnayi	mid/western Amazonia
	Orinoco piculet	Picumnus pumilus	northern Amazonia
	Golden-spangled piculet	Picumnus exilis	northern Amazonia, Guiana Shield, Baía de São Marcos and Atlantic Forest
	Ecuadorian piculet	Picumnus sclateri	western Ecuador
	Scaled piculet	Picumnus squamulatus	Colombia and Venezuela
	White-bellied piculet	Picumnus spilogaster	Orinoco, Branco, mouth of the Mazaruni River and Pará mangroves
	Arrowhead piculet	Picumnus minutissimus	northern Suriname
	Spotted piculet	Picumnus pygmaeus	northeastern Brazil
	Speckle-chested piculet	Picumnus steindachneri	northern Peru : Huallaga and Utcubamba river valleys
	Varzea piculet	Picumnus varzeae	Várzea forest of lower Amazon River
	White-barred piculet	Picumnus cirratus	Gran Chaco to eastern Brazil; also northeastern Amazonia
	Ocellated piculet	Picumnus dorbignyianus	central Andes (eastern slope)
	Ochre-collared piculet	Picumnus temminckii	southern Brazil
	White-wedged piculet	Picumnus albosquamatus	central Brazil and northeastern Bolivia
	Rusty-necked piculet	Picumnus fuscus	southern Rondonia
	Rufous-breasted piculet	Picumnus rufiventris	western Amazonia
	Ochraceous piculet	Picumnus limae	northern Ceara and Pernambuco
	Mottled piculet	Picumnus nebulosus	South Region and Uruguay
	Plain-breasted piculet	Picumnus castelnau	northern Peru : Ucayali and upper Amazon river
	Fine-barred piculet	Picumnus subtilis	southern Peru : Ene and Madre de Dios river
	Olivaceous piculet	Picumnus olivaceus	Central America, Colombia and Ecuador
	Greyish piculet	Picumnus granadensis	Cauca River valley
	Chestnut piculet	Picumnus cinnamomeus	northern Colombia and Maracaibo Basin

== See also ==
- Genus Sasia
