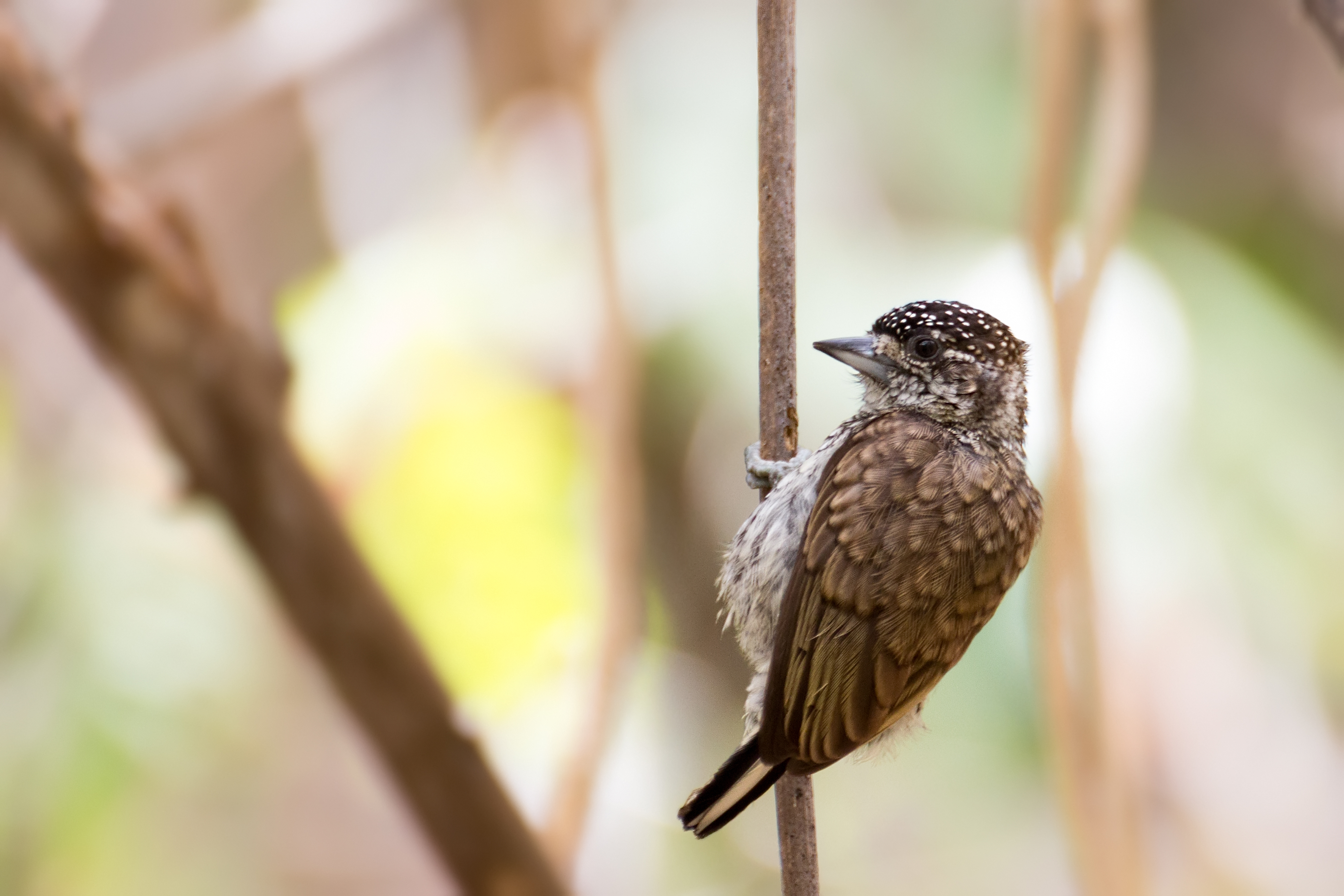
- Female

Conservation status
- Least Concern (IUCN 3.1)

Scientific classification
- Kingdom: Animalia
- Phylum: Chordata
- Class: Aves
- Order: Piciformes
- Family: Picidae
- Genus: Picumnus
- Species: P. squamulatus

Binomial name
- Picumnus squamulatus Lafresnaye, 1854

= Scaled piculet =

Species of woodpecker

The scaled piculet (Picumnus squamulatus) is a species of bird in subfamily Picumninae of the woodpecker family Picidae. It is found in Colombia and Venezuela.

== Taxonomy ==
The scaled piculet was formally described in 1854 by the French ornithologist Frédéric de Lafresnaye under the current binomial name Picumnus squamulatus based on a specimen collected in Colombia. The specific epithet is from Latin squamula meaning "little scale".

Five subspecies are recognised:

- P. s. squamulatus Lafresnaye, 1854 – northeast, central Colombia
- P. s. roehli Zimmer, JT & Phelps, WH, 1944 – northeast Colombia and north Venezuela
- P. s. obsoletus Allen, JA, 1892 – northeast Venezuela
- P. s. lovejoyi Phelps, WH Jr & Aveledo, 1987 – northwest Venezuela
- P. s. apurensis Phelps, WH Jr & Aveledo, 1987 – central north Venezuela

Subspecies P. s. lovejoyi might not be distinctive enough to warrant treatment as a taxon.

A study published in 2014 found that the black-dotted piculet, P. nigropunctatus Zimmer and Phelps (1950) was a junior synonym of Picumnus obsoletus Allen, JA (1892).

== Description ==
The scaled piculet is 8 to 9.2 cm (3.1 to 3.6 in) long and weighs 7 to 12 g (0.25 to 0.42 oz). Adult males of the nominate subspecies P. s. squamulatus have a black cap with red feather tips on the forehead and white ones on the rest of it. Their face is mostly brown with black tips on some feathers and a whitish line behind the eye. Their upperparts are olive brown with a scaly appearance due to narrow black borders on the feathers. Their flight feathers are brown with yellowish edges on the secondaries and tertials. Their tail is brownish black; the innermost pair of feathers have mostly white inner webs and the outer two pairs have a white area near the tip. Their chin and throat feathers are white with narrow gray-brown tips. The rest of their underparts are whitish with scaly markings similar to those of the upperparts. Adult females are identical but for white spots on their entire crown. Juveniles are darker above than adults and the scaly pattern on their underparts is more diffuse.

Subspecies P. s. roehli often has yellow or orange spots on the forehead instead of red ones, brighter upperparts than the nominate, a brownish yellow tinge to the belly, and narrower markings on the underparts. P. s. lovejoyi's forehead spots are always yellow and its upperparts are grayer than the nominate's. P. s. obsoletus has a yellow-green tinge to the upperparts and has yellowish white underparts with paler and finer "scale" markings and dark streaks in the feather centers. P. s. apurensis appears whiter than the nominate on its underparts, and the scaly marks are narrow and indistinct.

The scaled piculet makes a "high-pitched squeaky 'chi-chi-ch'e'e'chi', becoming trill-like at [the] end."

== Distribution and habitat ==
The scaled piculet inhabits a variety of semi-open to open landscapes including gallery forest, the edges of primary forest, secondary forest, deciduous woodland, farmland with scattered trees, and pastures. In elevation it ranges up to 1,900 m (6,200 ft). As far as is known, the scaled piculet is a year-round resident throughout its range.

== Behavior ==
=== Food and feeding ===
The scaled piculet feeds on small insects. It forages on thin branches and twigs in dense vegetation or small trees, usually singly or in pairs.

=== Breeding ===
The scaled piculet's breeding season is not well defined, but appears to include October to January in Colombia and April to June (and perhaps to September) in Venezuela. Nothing else is known about its breeding biology.

== Status ==
The IUCN has assessed the scaled piculet as being of Least Concern. It has a large range, and though its population size is not known it is believed to be stable. No immediate threats have been identified. It is "[p]ossibly not uncommon, and may perhaps be overlooked owing to inconspicuous behaviour." It occurs in at least two protected areas in Venezuela.
