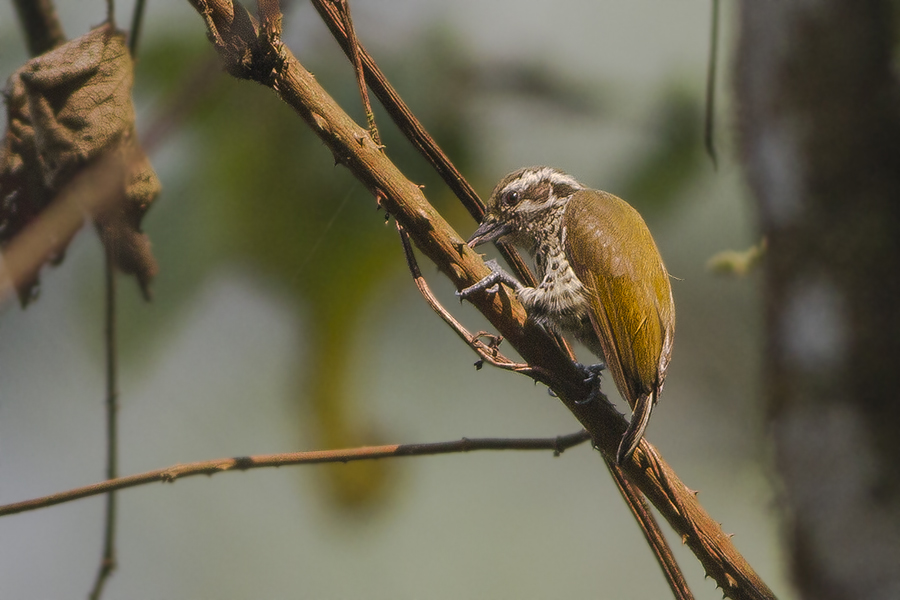
- Speckled piculet in Pangolakha Wildlife Sanctuary

Conservation status
- Least Concern (IUCN 3.1)

Scientific classification
- Kingdom: Animalia
- Phylum: Chordata
- Class: Aves
- Order: Piciformes
- Family: Picidae
- Genus: Picumnus
- Species: P. innominatus

Binomial name
- Picumnus innominatus Burton, 1836

= Speckled piculet =

Species of bird

The speckled piculet (Picumnus innominatus) is a species of bird in the family Picidae. It is found in India, China and Southeast Asia.

== Taxonomy ==
The speckled piculet was formally described in 1836 by the English zoologist Edward Burton under the current binomial name Picumnus innominatus from a specimen collected in the "Himalayas". The locality is taken to be the state of Sikkim in northeast India. The specific epithet innominatus is Latin meaning "unnamed".

Three subspecies are recognised:

- P. i. innominatus Burton, 1836 – northeast Afghanistan, north Pakistan, Kashmir to southeast Tibet, Nepal and northeast India
- P. i. malayorum Hartert, EJO, 1912 – south, east India to south China, Indochina, Sumatra and Borneo
- P. i. chinensis (Hargitt, 1881) – central, east, south China

== Description ==
The male and female birds look alike. They have olive-green backs, with two white stripes on the side of their heads. The male bird has orange and brown on the forecrown. They have a creamy-white coloring below, with black spots. There is a dark green band near the eyes.

== Distribution and habitat ==
It is found in the Indian subcontinent and Southeast Asia, ranging across Bangladesh, Bhutan, Cambodia, Hong Kong, India, Indonesia, Laos, Malaysia, Myanmar, Nepal, Pakistan, Thailand, Tibet and Vietnam. Its natural habitats are boreal forests, subtropical or tropical moist lowland forest, and subtropical or tropical moist montane forest. In India, it is found in the Himalayan foothills, up to an altitude of about 2500m. It can be found in bamboo jungles.

== Behavior ==
They usually move about in pairs, on thin branches, and sometimes hang from the branch, upside-down. Their behavior is quite similar to that of woodpeckers.

== Food and feeding ==
The speckled piculet has a diet consisting of ants and termites.
