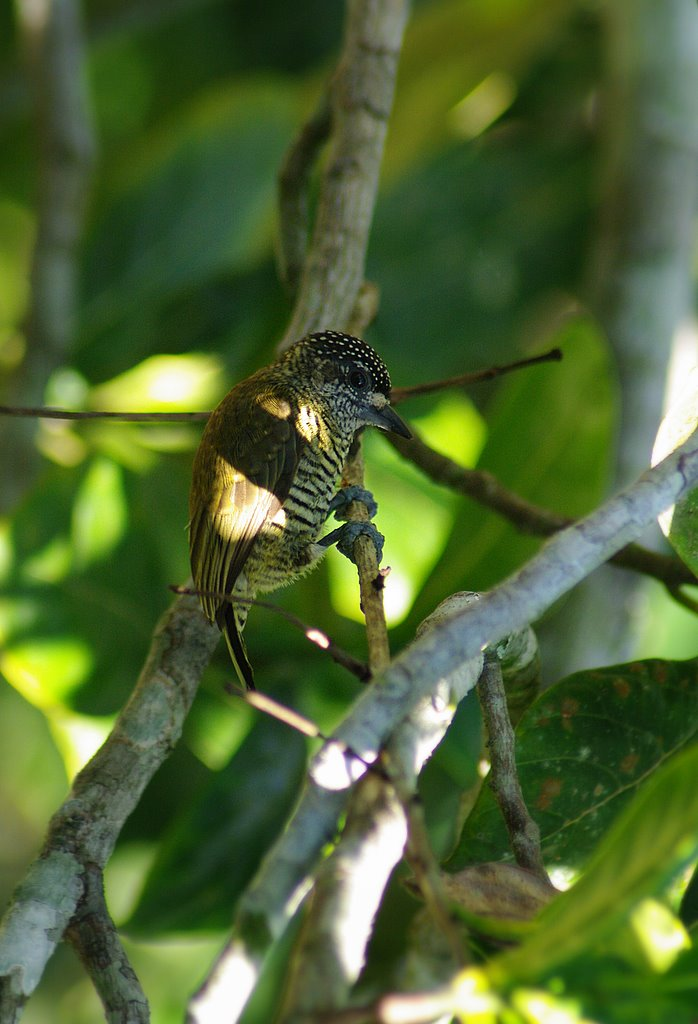

Conservation status
- Least Concern (IUCN 3.1)

Scientific classification
- Kingdom: Animalia
- Phylum: Chordata
- Class: Aves
- Order: Piciformes
- Family: Picidae
- Genus: Picumnus
- Species: P. exilis

Binomial name
- Picumnus exilis (Lichtenstein, MHC, 1823)

= Golden-spangled piculet =

Species of woodpecker

The golden-spangled piculet (Picumnus exilis) is a species of bird in subfamily Picumninae of the woodpecker family Picidae. It is found in Brazil, Colombia, French Guiana, Guyana, Suriname, and Venezuela.

== Taxonomy and systematics ==
The International Ornithological Committee (IOC) and BirdLife International's Handbook of the Birds of the World assign these six subspecies to the golden-spangled piculet:

- P. e. clarus Zimmer, J.T. & Phelps, W.H., 1946
- P. e. undulatus Hargitt, 1889
- P. e. buffonii Lafresnaye, 1845
- P. e. pernambucensis Zimmer, J.T., 1947
- P. e. alegriae Hellmayr, 1929
- P. e. exilis (Lichtenstein, M.H.C., 1823)

However, the Clements taxonomy recognizes only four subspecies. It includes P. e. clarus within P. e. undulatus and P. e. alegriae within P. e. buffonii. Subspecies P. e. undulatus and P. e. buffonii were treated as separate species in the early 20th century.

This article follows the six-subspecies model.

== Description ==
The golden-spangled piculet is 9 to 10 cm (3.5 to 3.9 in) long and weighs 8.5 to 10 g (0.30 to 0.35 oz). Adult males of the nominate subspecies P. e. exilis have a black cap and nape, with red spots on the forehead and white spots on the rest. Their face is yellowish white with dark speckles, bare grayish skin around the eye, and a pale stripe behind the eye. Their upperparts are olive green with darker centers to the feathers. Their primaries and secondaries are brownish green with yellow-green edges. Their wing coverts are olive green with narrow white edges and black-edged white tips. The upper side of their tail is dark brown; the innermost pair of feathers have mostly white inner webs and the outer three pairs have a large white patch near the tip. Their chin, throat, and underparts are pale yellowish with blackish bars that are more spot-like on the belly. The beak's maxilla is black and the mandible black with a silvery base; the legs are grayish with sometimes a green or blue tinge. Adult females are identical but for white spots on their entire crown. Juveniles are similar to adults but duller overall, an olive crown with pale streaking, and more diffuse bars on the underparts.

Subspecies P. e. undulatus has a more olive color on its upperparts than the nominate, with large black feather centers, and its wing coverts' tips are not as contrasting. P. e. clarus is yellower above than undulatus and has narrower dark bars on the underparts. P. e. buffonii has distinctive white spots with black borders on the tips of the wing coverts. P. e. alegriae is generally duller than the nominate, more olive above, and whiter below. P. e. pernambucensis has more olive upperparts than the nominate and more even bars on the underparts.

== Distribution and habitat ==
The subspecies of golden-spangled piculet are found thus:

- P. e. clarus, east-central Venezuela
- P. e. undulatus, from eastern Colombia through southeastern Venezuela into western Guyana and northern Brazil's state of Roraima
- P. e. buffonii, north of the Amazon River from eastern Guyana through Suriname and French Guiana to Amapá in northeastern Brazil
- P. e. pernambucensis, northeastern Brazil's Pernambuco and Alagoas states
- P. e. alegriae, northeastern Brazil south of the Amazon from northeastern Pará to northwestern Maranhão
- P. e. exilis, east central Brazil from Bahia south to Espírito Santo

The golden-spangled piculet inhabits a variety of wooded landscapes including rain-, cloud-, and secondary forest. It also occurs in tracts of bamboo, in mangroves, and in open woodland and the edges of savanna. In elevation it ranges from sea level to about 1,900 m (6,200 ft) in the tepui region where Venezuela, Guyana, and Brazil meet.

== Behavior ==
=== Movement ===
As far as is known, the golden-spangled piculet is a year-round resident throughout its range.

=== Feeding ===
The golden-spangled piculet's diet has not been fully defined but is known to include ants. It forages in the forest's lower strata, typically below 5 m (20 ft), and mostly takes its food from small branches, sometimes hanging upside down. It typically forages alone or in pairs and sometimes joins mixed-species foraging flocks.

=== Breeding ===
Little is known about the golden-spangled piculet's breeding biology. It nests between December and March in Venezuela and Suriname. It excavates its nest hole in soft wood, such as in a stump.

=== Vocalization ===
The golden-spangled piculet's song has been described as "tsilit, tsirrrr" and an "extr. high, thin 'see see suw'."

== Status ==
The IUCN has assessed the golden-spangled piculet as being of Least Concern. It has a very large range but its population size is not known and is believed to be decreasing. No immeditate threats have been identified. The species is poorly known. It occurs in several protect areas, and because "this piculet is often found in more open habitats, including disturbed forest, human activities may possibly lead to its range being expanded."
