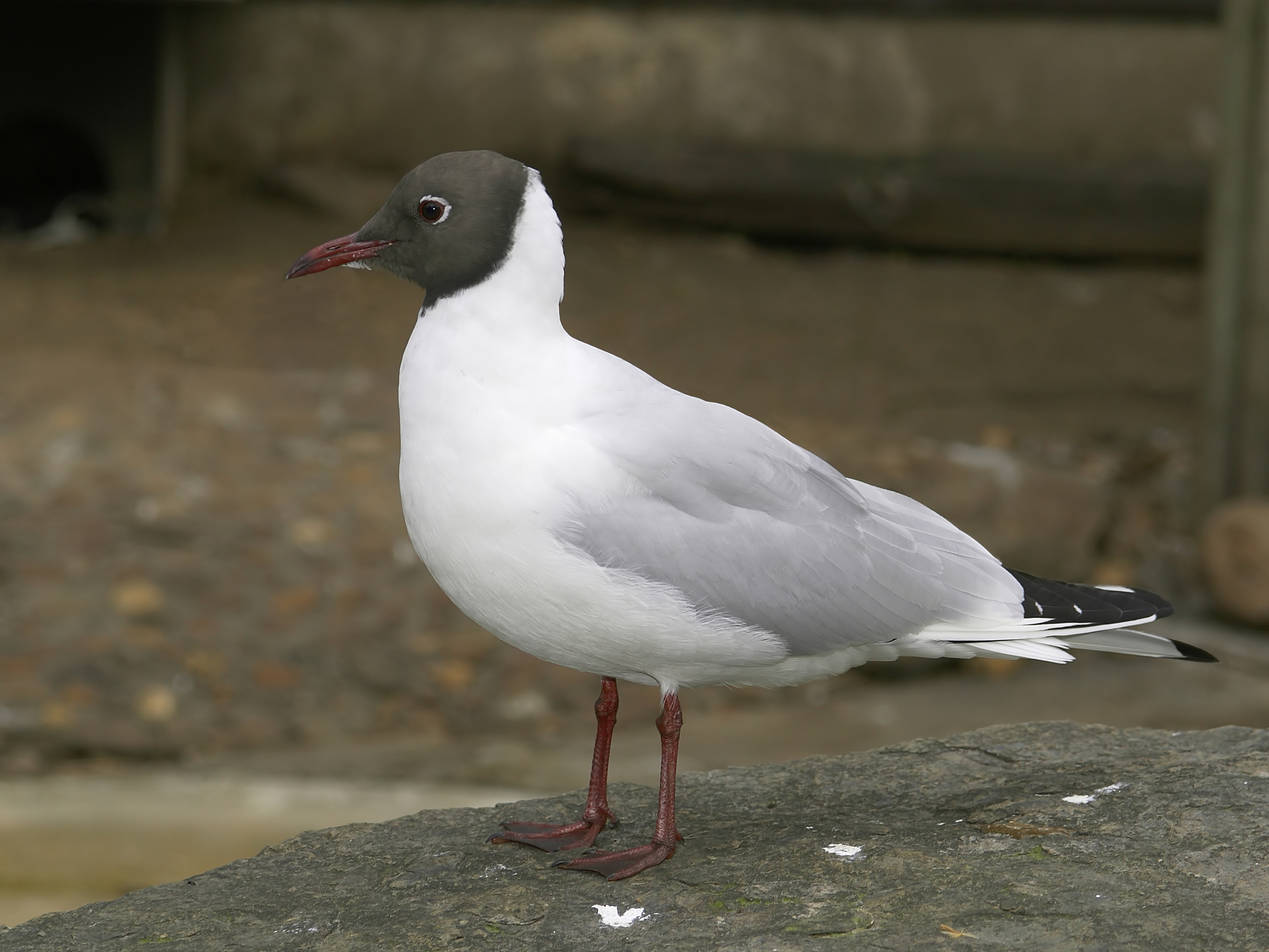
- Adult summer plumage
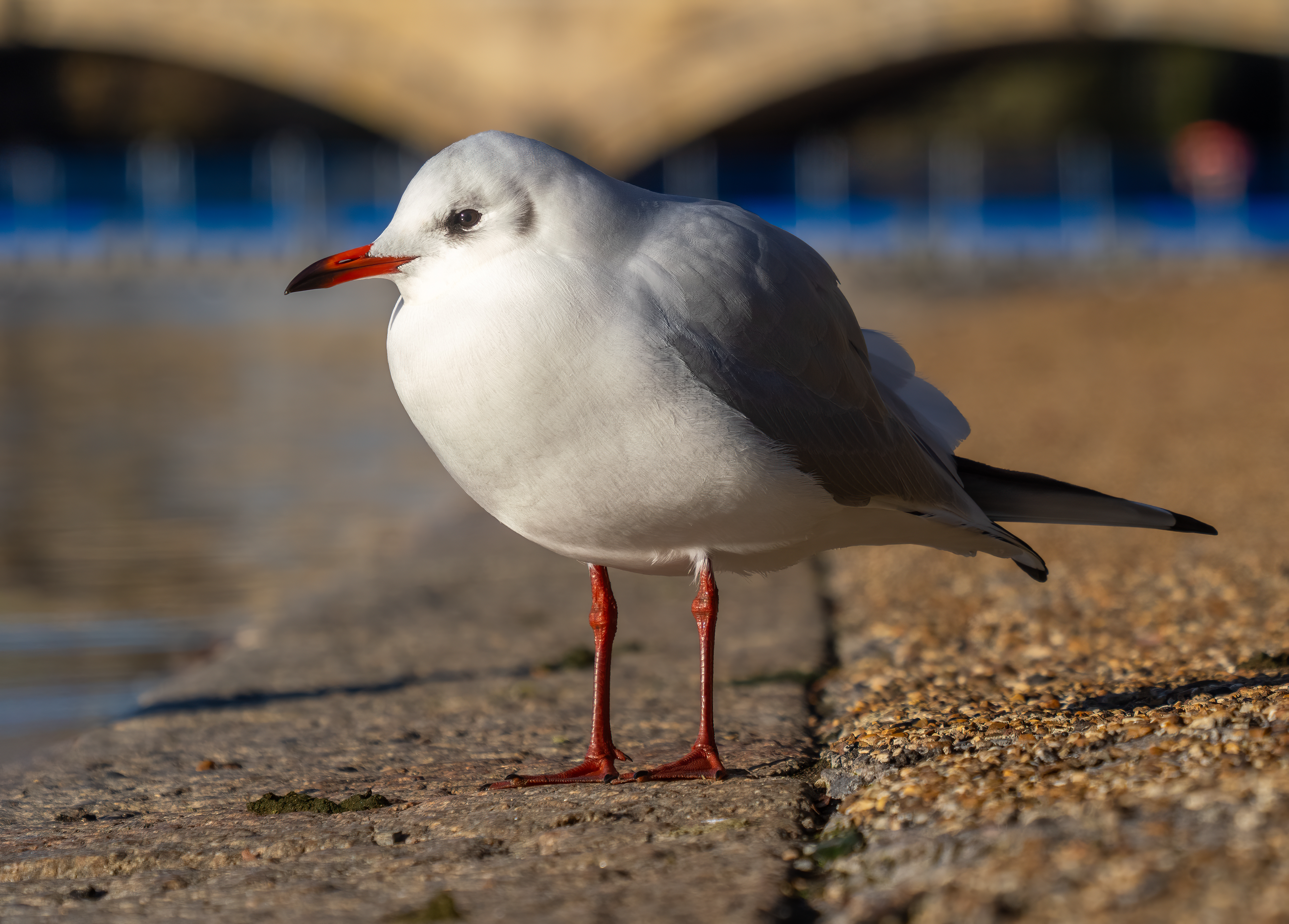
- Adult winter plumage Colony sounds, Suffolk, England

Conservation status
- Least Concern (IUCN 3.1)

Scientific classification
- Kingdom: Animalia
- Phylum: Chordata
- Class: Aves
- Order: Charadriiformes
- Family: Laridae
- Genus: Chroicocephalus
- Species: C. ridibundus

Binomial name
- Chroicocephalus ridibundus (Linnaeus, 1766)
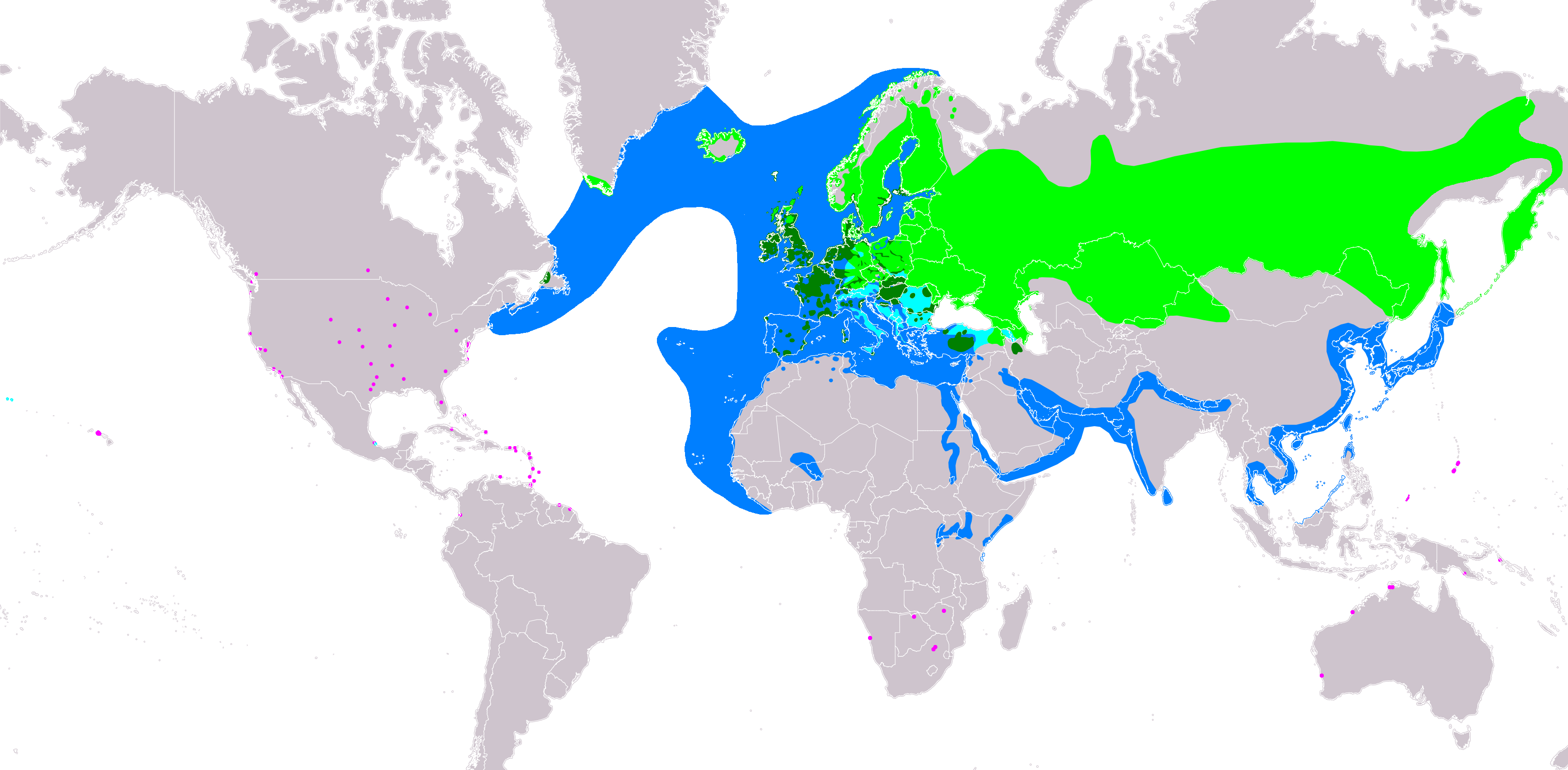
- Distribution: Breeding summer visitor Breeding resident Non-breeding passage migrant Non-breeding winter visitor Vagrant records

Synonyms
- Larus ridibundus Linnaeus, 1766

= Black-headed gull =

Species of bird

Adults and immatures with winter plumage in Japan.

Black-headed gulls foraging for various crustaceans and other edibles.

A small flock in winter plumage in Sweden.

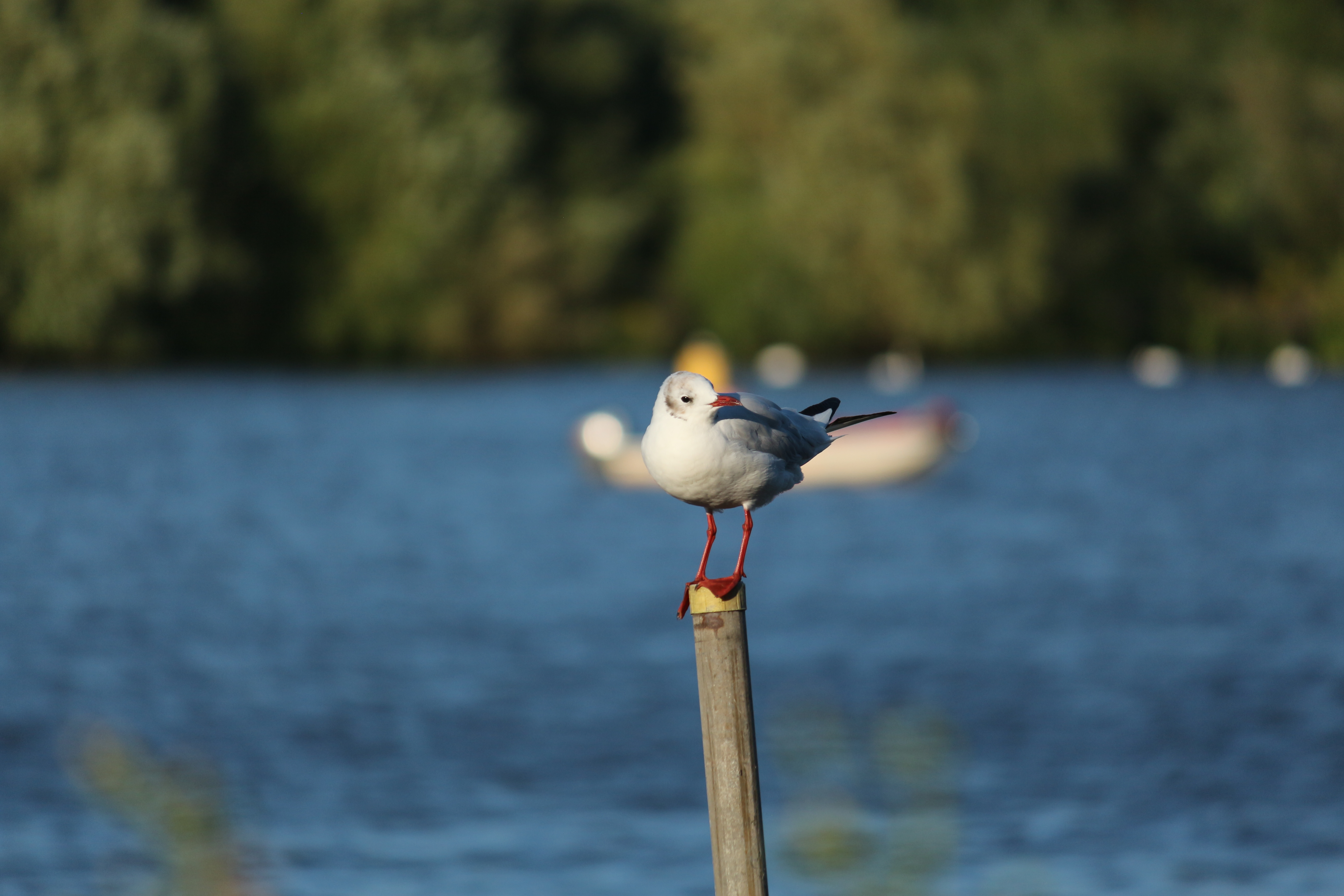
Black-headed gull in Winsford

The black-headed gull (Chroicocephalus ridibundus) is a small gull that breeds in much of the Palearctic in Europe and Asia, and also locally in smaller numbers in coastal eastern Canada. Most of the population is migratory and winters further south, but many also remain in the milder areas of northwestern Europe. It was formerly sometimes cited as "common black-headed gull" to distinguish it from "great black-headed gull" (an old name for Pallas's gull).

The genus name Chroicocephalus is from the Ancient Greek words khroizo, "to colour", and kephale, "head". The specific name ridibundus is Latin for "laughing".

== Taxonomy ==
The black-headed gull was formally described in 1766 by the Swedish naturalist Carl Linnaeus in the twelfth edition of his Systema Naturae. He placed it with the other gulls in the genus Larus and coined the binomial name Larus ridibundus. Linnaeus specified the locality as Mari Europaeo or European seas.

Genetic studies published early in the 21st century showed that the genus Larus was paraphyletic with respect to other gull genera, and extensive changes to the taxonomy of gulls were made with many species of gull removed from Larus and transferred to other genera. The black-headed gull is now placed with nine other species in the resurrected genus Chroicocephalus that had originally been introduced in 1836 by Thomas Eyton. The genus name Chroicocephalus combines the Ancient Greek χρωικος/khrōikos meaning "coloured" with -κεφαλος /-kephalos meaning "-headed". The specific epithet ridibundus is Latin meaning "laughing".

=== Subspecies ===
Some authorities treat the black-headed gull as a monotypic species with no subspecies, while others treat it as having two subspecies, C. r. ridibundus in the west and centre of the range, and C. r. sibiricus in the far east (eastern Siberia; wintering in Japan and eastern China). The latter is slightly larger and relatively longer-winged. The variation is likely clinal, with intergrades in central Siberia.

== Description ==
This gull is 34–39 cm (13 1/2–15 1/2 in) long with a 100–110 cm (39 1/2–43 1/2 in) wingspan and weighs 166–400 g (5 7/8–14 1/8 oz); males (186–400 g) average heavier than females (166–350 g), but with considerable overlap.

In flight, the white leading edge of the outer wing (the outer primaries) is a good field mark, particularly combined with the dark underside of the inner primaries, which distinguishes it from the white underside of those feathers in its close relative the Bonaparte's gull. The summer adult has a chocolate-brown head (not black, although does look black from a distance), white neck, underparts and tail, pale grey wings and back, black tips to the primary wing feathers, and red bill and legs. The hood is lost in winter, leaving just two dark spots above and behind the eye. Summer plumage occurs from March to July (rarely from late January, and into August), winter plumage from late July until March or April. Black-headed gulls take two years to reach maturity. Juvenile birds, for the first month or two after fledging, have a mottled pattern of brown spots over most of the body, and a black band on the tail; in late summer, they moult into first-winter plumage, with a grey back, but retaining a brown carpal bar on the inner wing, blackish secondary feathers, and the black band on the tail. In their first summer (one year old), they develop a partial brown hood, the extent of which is very variable between individuals from almost no brown on the head, to a hood like a full adult's. The second winter plumage is like adult plumage, except for occasional brown marks on the wings and tail tip in some individuals. There is no difference in plumage between the sexes.

It breeds in colonies in large reed beds or marshes, or on islands in lakes, nesting on the ground; colonies may range from a few (or even single) pairs up to several thousand pairs, exceptionally over 10,000 pairs. Like most gulls, it is highly gregarious in winter, both when feeding and in evening roosts. It is not a pelagic species and is rarely seen at sea far from coasts.

Like most gulls, black-headed gulls are long-lived birds, with a maximum age of at least 32.9 years recorded in the wild.

== Distribution ==
Black-headed gulls breed across the Palearctic over much of Europe and northern Asia, from Iceland and Ireland east to Japan and eastern China. It is abundant, with a global population of 2–3 million pairs; most numerous in Europe, with up to 300,000 pairs in Great Britain and 250,000 pairs in Poland the largest concentrations. The range is slowly expanding westwards, with Iceland first colonised in 1911, Greenland in 1969, and Newfoundland in Canada in 1977, with around 20 pairs breeding in northeastern Canada in the late 20th century. They migrate south and west away from regions which freeze hard in winter, reaching northern Africa and southern Asia (with small numbers south to the Equator). Areas within the breeding range with milder winters such as Great Britain receive large influxes of migrants from colder areas like Scandinavia, Poland, the Baltic States, and Russia; the British winter population is around 3 million. Small numbers occur in winter in northeast North America as far south as Virginia, often in flocks of the similar-looking Bonaparte's gull.

=== Vagrancy ===
South of its regular range in eastern North America, it is recorded as a very rare transient south to the Carolina coast, and also in some Caribbean islands and Mexico. There are a few records from Australia, the first on 19 October 1991, at Broome, Western Australia, and others at Darwin, Northern Territory in 1998, 2005, and 2006. It is also a vagrant south in Africa as far as the Pretoria area in South Africa.

== Disease ==
Black-headed gulls were among the birds most heavily hit by the 2023 avian influenza outbreak, with over 4,000 birds killed in Great Britain by early May; similarly high mortality rates were also reported from France, the Netherlands, Italy and Germany.

== Behaviour ==
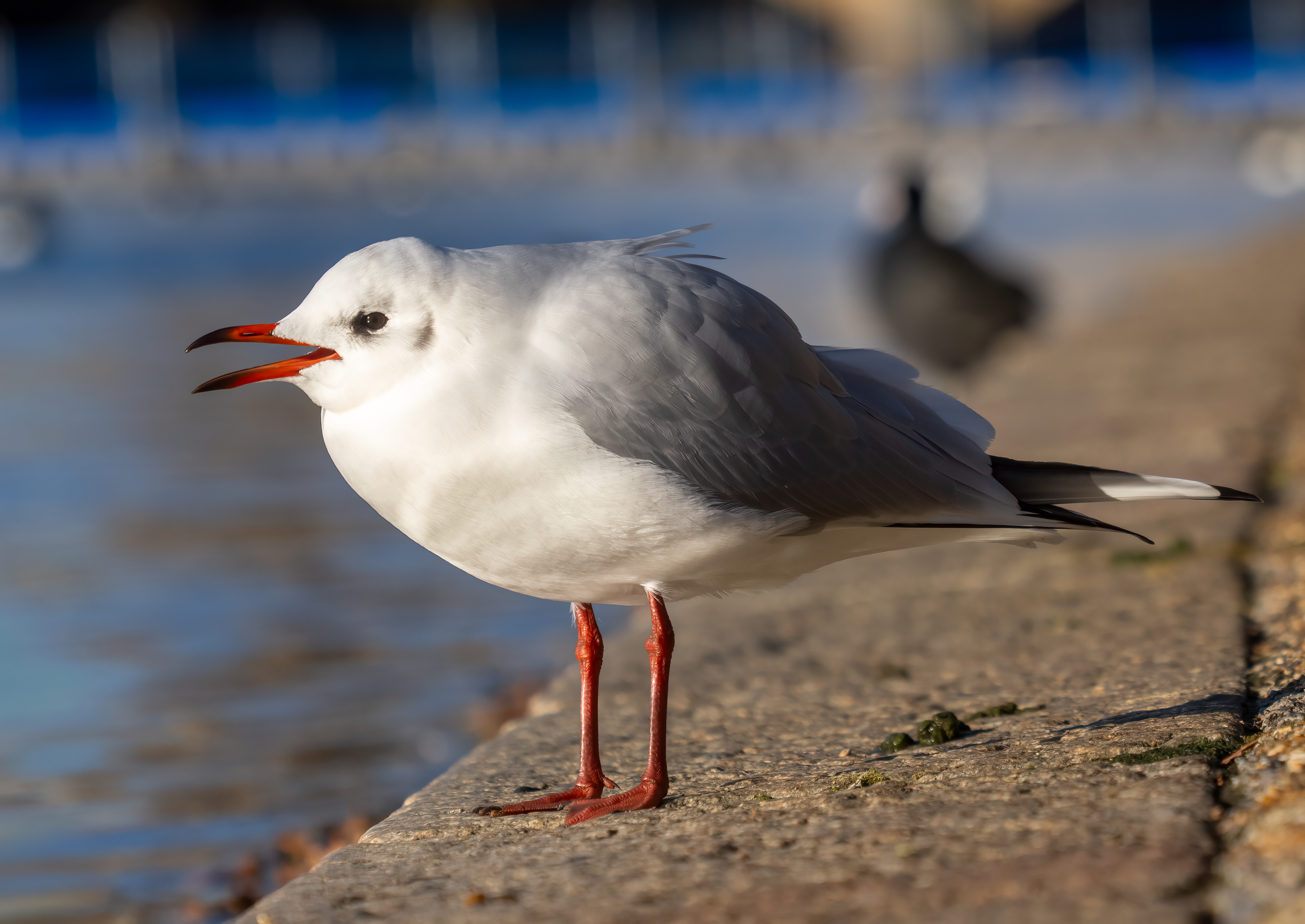
Vocalizing in London

The black-headed gull is a bold and opportunistic feeder. It eats insects, fish, seeds, worms, scraps, and carrion in towns, or invertebrates in ploughed fields with equal facility. It is a noisy species, especially in colonies, with a familiar "kree-ar" call.

It displays a variety of behaviour and adaptations. Some of these include removing eggshells from the nest after hatching, begging co-ordination between siblings, differences between sexes, conspecific brood parasitism, and extra-pair paternity. They are found in a variety of different habitats.

=== Breeding ===
==== Eggshell removal ====
Eggshell removal is a behaviour seen in birds once the chicks have hatched, observed mostly to reduce risk of predation. Removing the eggshell acts as a way of camouflage to avoid predators seeing the nest. The further away egg shells are from the nest, the lower the predation risk. Black-headed gull eggs experience predation from different species of birds, foxes, stoats, and even other black-headed gulls. Although mothers show some form of aggressiveness when a predator is near, in the first 30 minutes, wet chicks can be easily taken by other black-headed gulls after hatching when the parents of the wet chick are distracted.

Black headed gulls also carry away other objects that do not belong in the nest. The removal of eggshells and other objects is important not only in the incubation period but also during the first few days after the eggs hatch. However, the removal process seems to increase as time goes on. The removal is done by both the male and female parents, normally lasts a few seconds and is done three times a year.

A black-headed gull is able to differentiate an egg shell from an egg by acknowledging its thin, serrated, white, edge; the weight of the egg or eggshell does not play a role when determining its value.

Earlier hypotheses have attempted to explain the survival value of black-headed gulls removing their eggshells from the nest, including:

1. The sharp edges of the shells after hatching could harm the chicks
2. The eggshell could somehow intrude during the brooding
3. The eggshell could slip over the unhatched egg, creating a double shell
4. Some of the moist organic material left from the shell could lead to a production of bacteria and mould

==== Begging coordination between siblings ====
Black-headed gulls feed their young by regurgitating onto the ground, rather than into each chick one at a time. The parents tend to accommodate their regurgitation amounts for how intense the nest begging is, from both an individual chick or a group of chicks begging together. Chicks who are siblings, have learned this behaviour and begin synchronising their begging signals to decrease the costs as an individual and increase the benefits as a whole. The rate of parental food regurgitation to chicks increases with begging intensity.

The amount and response of begging signals differs throughout the nestling period. Usually, there are 3–5 begging events/hour, each lasting around one minute. High intensity begging behaviour appears at the end of the first week in the nest, but the coordination between multiple chicks emerge during the last week of the nestling period. The more siblings present, the more they coordinate their begging while decreasing the number of begging.

==== Sex differences ====
Male chicks have less of a chance of survival when compared to female chicks. Black-headed gulls are a sexually size-dimorphic species, so the larger sex is at a disadvantage when the amount of food sources are low.

Male birds are more likely to be born in the first egg and female birds are more likely to be born in the third. The position of a female black-headed gull in response to the food available when laying the eggs can predict the offspring's characteristics.

==== Conspecific brood parasitism ====
Conspecific brood parasitism is a behaviour that occurs when females lay their eggs in another female's nest, of the same species. It can reduce the cost of incubation and nestling young by passing it on to another bird. Black-headed gulls usually lay three egg clutches, and the first two are normally larger than the third. The third egg normally has the lowest survival rate, while the first or second are usually the parasitic eggs.

Most of the egg dumping occurs within the beginning of the egg laying period. The parasitic eggs being laid in another conspecific's nest increases the chance of hatching and may occur because of nest desertion or a nest being taken over by another bird.

Multiple eggs in a nest from different mothers may also result from intra-specific nest parasitism, joint female nesting, and nest takeover. Intra-specific nest parasitism is a disadvantage to the hosts because the female could end up taking care of the parasitic chicks over her own and therefore neglecting them and reducing their fitness. Another disadvantage for the host is that incubating more chicks than their own takes up more energy.

==== Extra-pair paternity ====
The rate of extra-pair paternity (EPP) has a large variation between populations of black-headed gulls. It is primarily a context-dependent strategy, meaning not all black headed gulls experience this behaviour. The variation between populations of extra-pair paternity can be explained by the variation it has on the advantages and disadvantages it has on a female, as well, as the variation in pressure on a females choice.

The differences in the rate of EPP may be determined by multiple different factors: life history traits, ecological factors or different behavioural strategies of males.

==== Central–periphery gradient within colonies ====
Egg-laying can be earlier in Black-headed Gulls nesting in the centre of the colony, with central pairs tending to lay larger eggs, which have a higher hatching success, than pairs nesting at the periphery of the colony. Centrally nesting individuals have also been found to be in better condition and have higher genetic quality.

=== Walking displays ===
Black-headed gulls display both head-bobbing walking (HBW) and non-bobbing walking (NBW). Head-bobbing walking is expressed by a hold phase and a thrust phase. The hold phase in black-headed gulls occurs mainly during the single support phase and is when the bird balances its head to equal the environment. Head-bobbing walking occurs during a seeking type foraging by walking through water and includes benefits such as enhancing motion and pattern detection and gathering depth information from motion parallax during the thrust phase. Non-bobbing walking occurs when black-headed gulls are displaying a waiting behaviour while foraging on flat surfaces.

=== Synchronisation ===
Observations on the behaviour of black-headed gulls show that individuals synchronise their vigilance activity with other neighbouring black-headed gulls. Synchronisation in black-headed gulls groups is dependent on the distance between the individuals.

== Uses ==
The eggs of the black-headed gull were considered a delicacy by some in the UK and eaten hard boiled. The collection of black-headed gull eggs is heavily regulated by the UK government. Eggs may only be taken by a small number of licensed individuals at six sites between 1 April and 15 May each year and only a single egg may be taken from each nest. No eggs are permitted to be sold after 30 June. As the gulls tend to lay in late April and early May, the eggs are only available to purchase for 3 or 4 weeks per year.

== In popular culture ==
The black-headed gull is the official bird of Tokyo, Japan, and the Yurikamome automated guideway transit in Tokyo Bay is named after it.

In Richard Adams' 1972 novel Watership Down, a black-headed gull named Kehaar (who claims his name is the onomatopoeia of waves breaking against the shore) plays a major part in the story. Injured by a farm cat and left behind during the seasonal migration, Kehaar finds himself stranded on the Downs and is taken in by a warren of rabbits. He later becomes their friend and ally, and helps to save the rabbits from danger many times; instincts eventually force him to return to his colony, but he promises to visit the rabbits each winter. True to Adams' stated intentions of trying to keep his fictional animals' behaviour close to reality, Kehaar is characterised as intelligent, gregarious, noisy, messy, and impatient, and with a guttural accent. Kehaar appears in all three screen adaptations of the novel; the character was voiced by Zero Mostel in the 1978 film, Rik Mayall in the 1999 TV series, and Peter Capaldi in the 2018 miniseries.

== Gallery ==
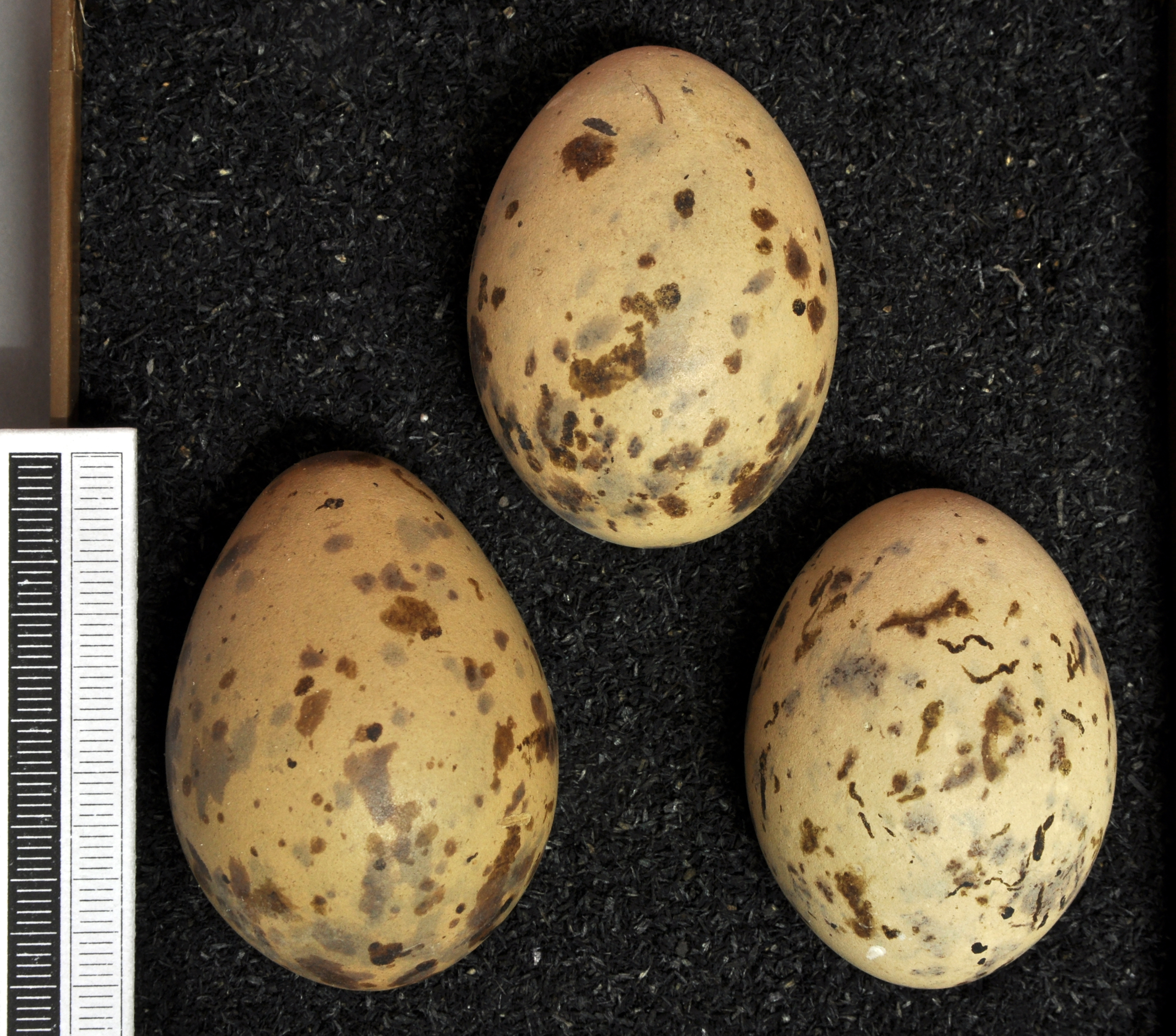
Eggs, Collection Museum Wiesbaden, Germany

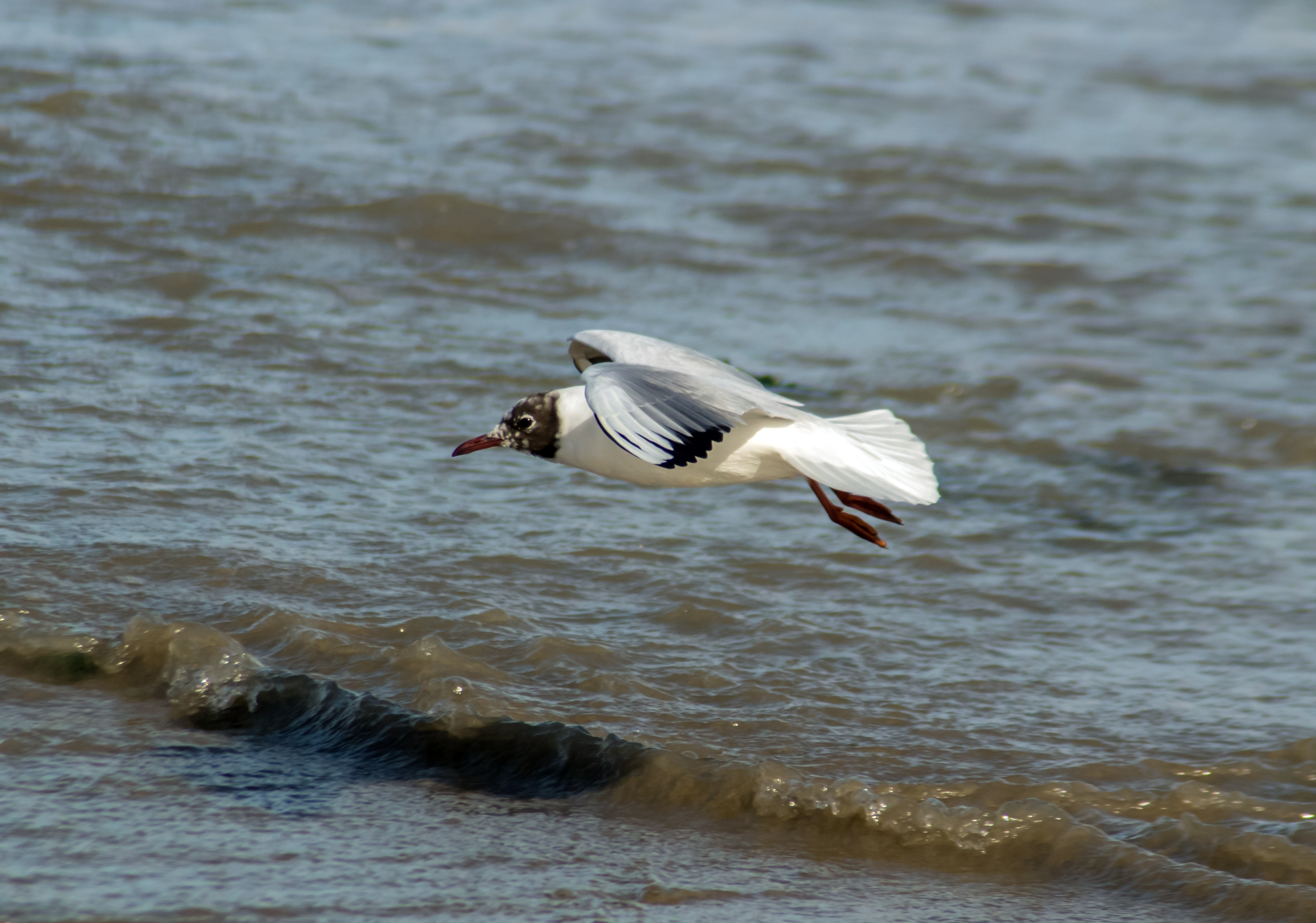
Chroicocephalus ridibundus, Radès sea, Tunisia

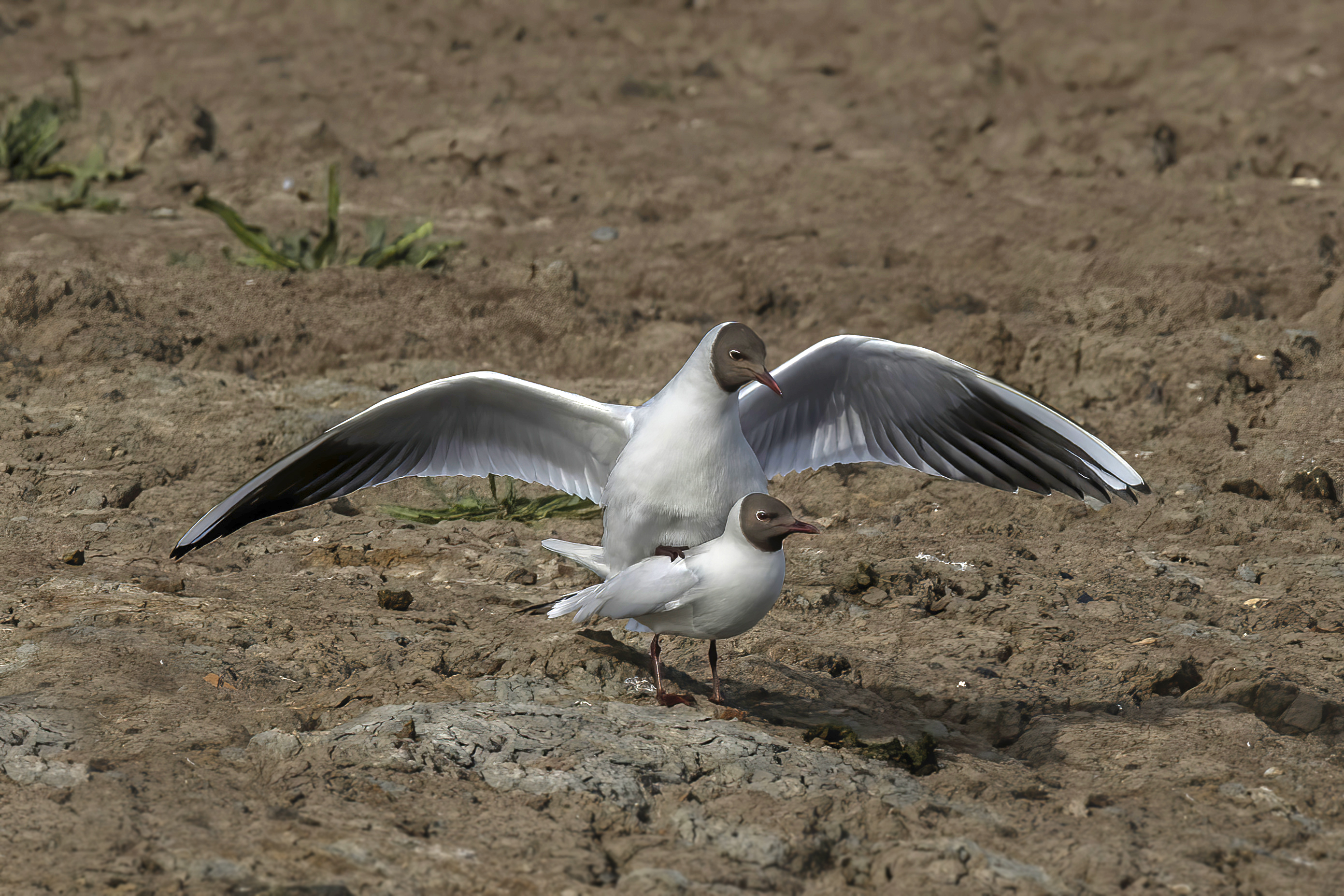
mating

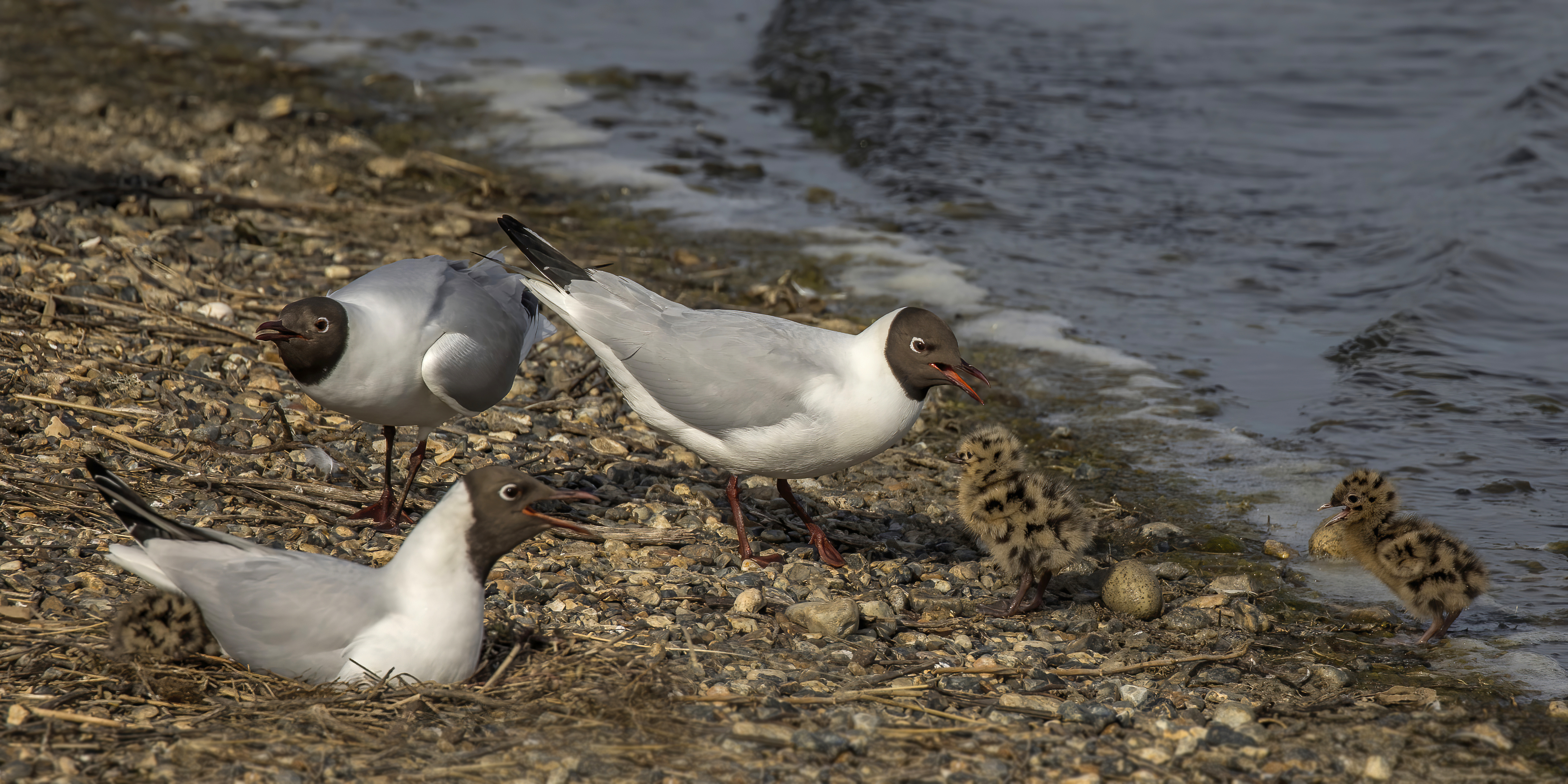
nesting and with chicks

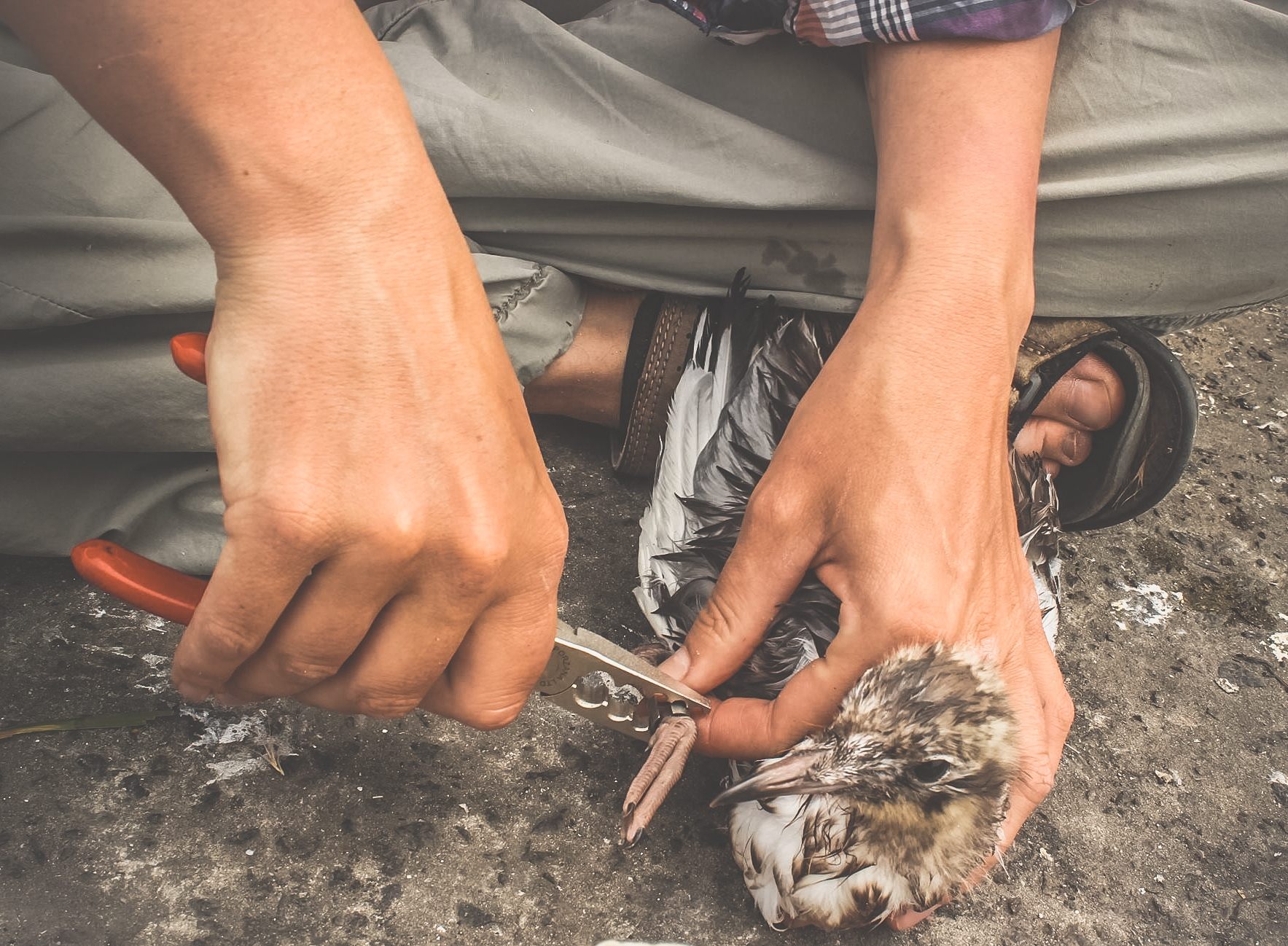
Ringing a black-headed gull nestling

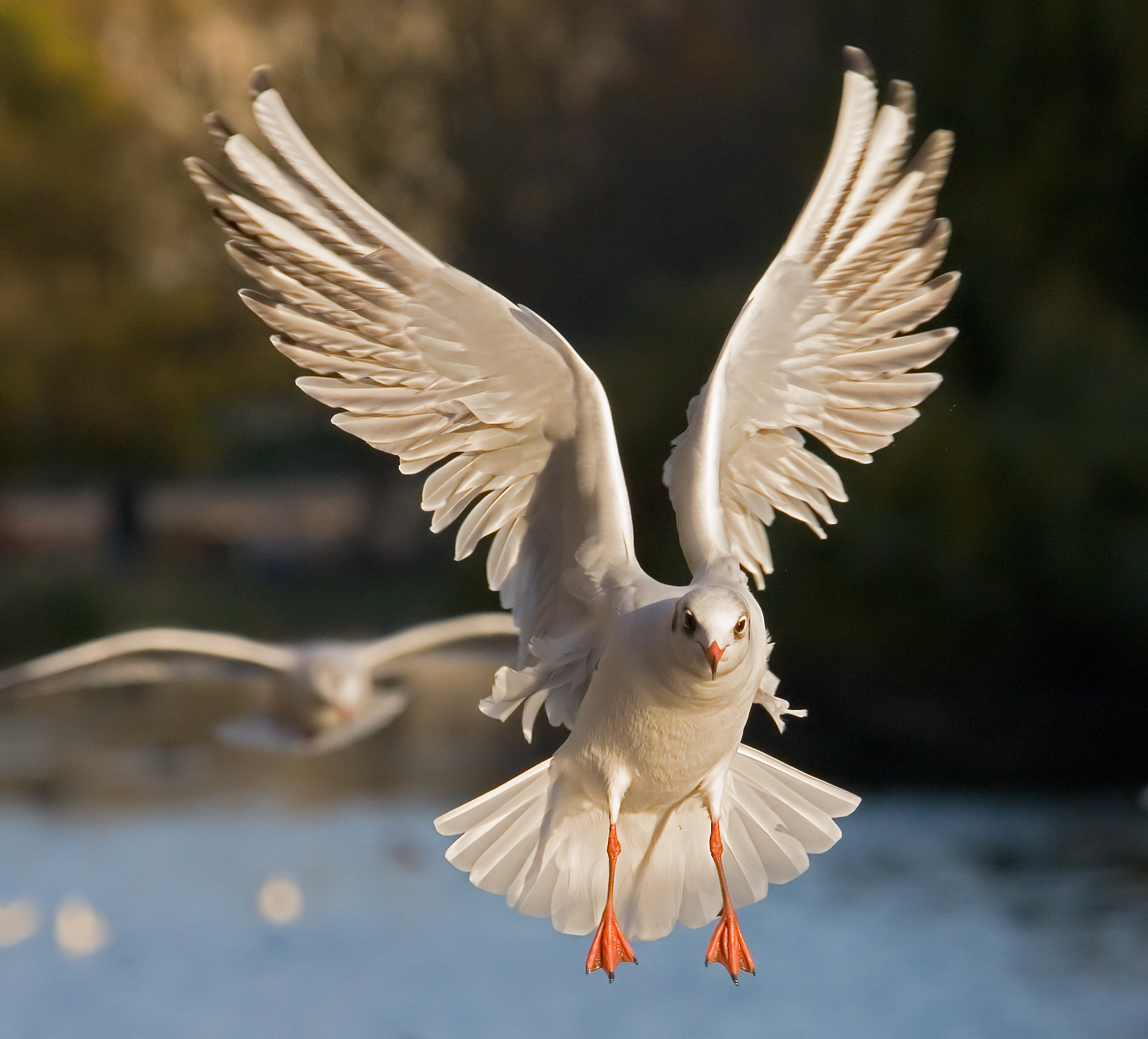
Adult winter plumage in St James's Park, London

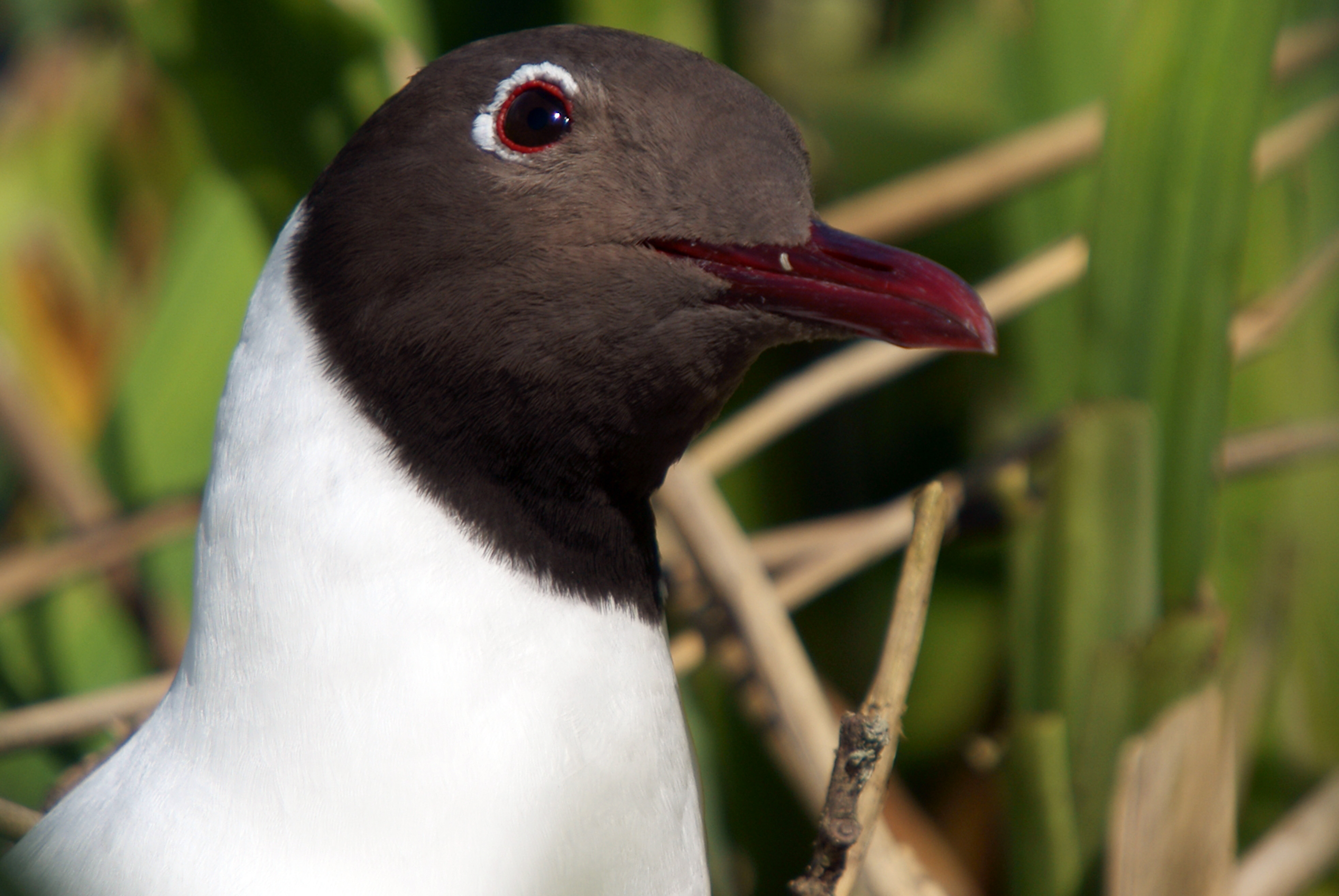
Adult breeding plumage

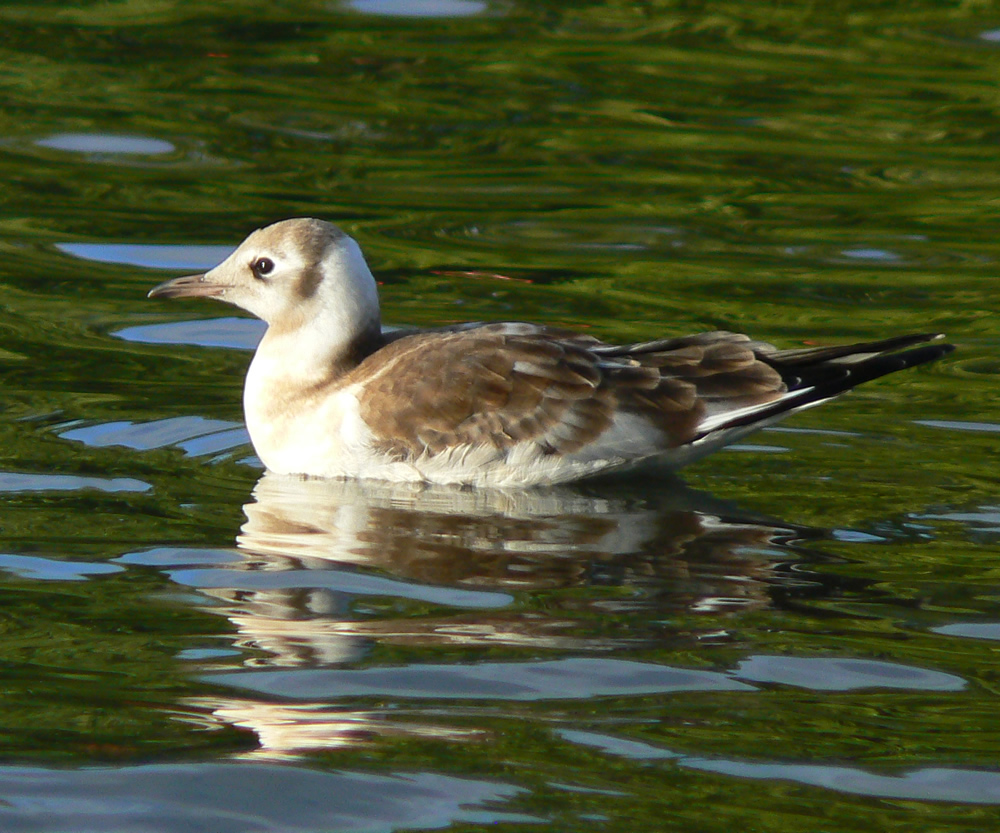
Juvenile plumage

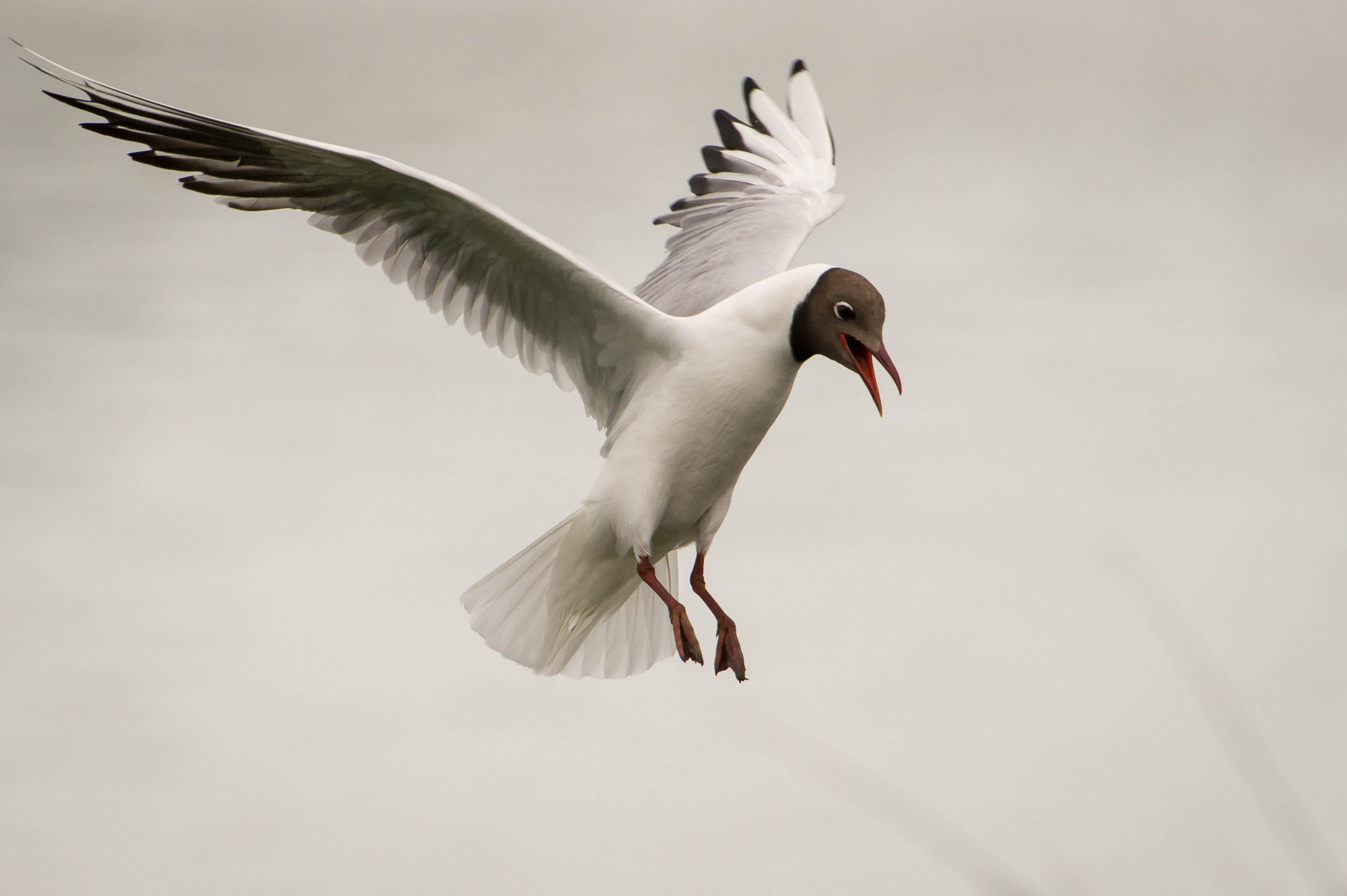
In flight

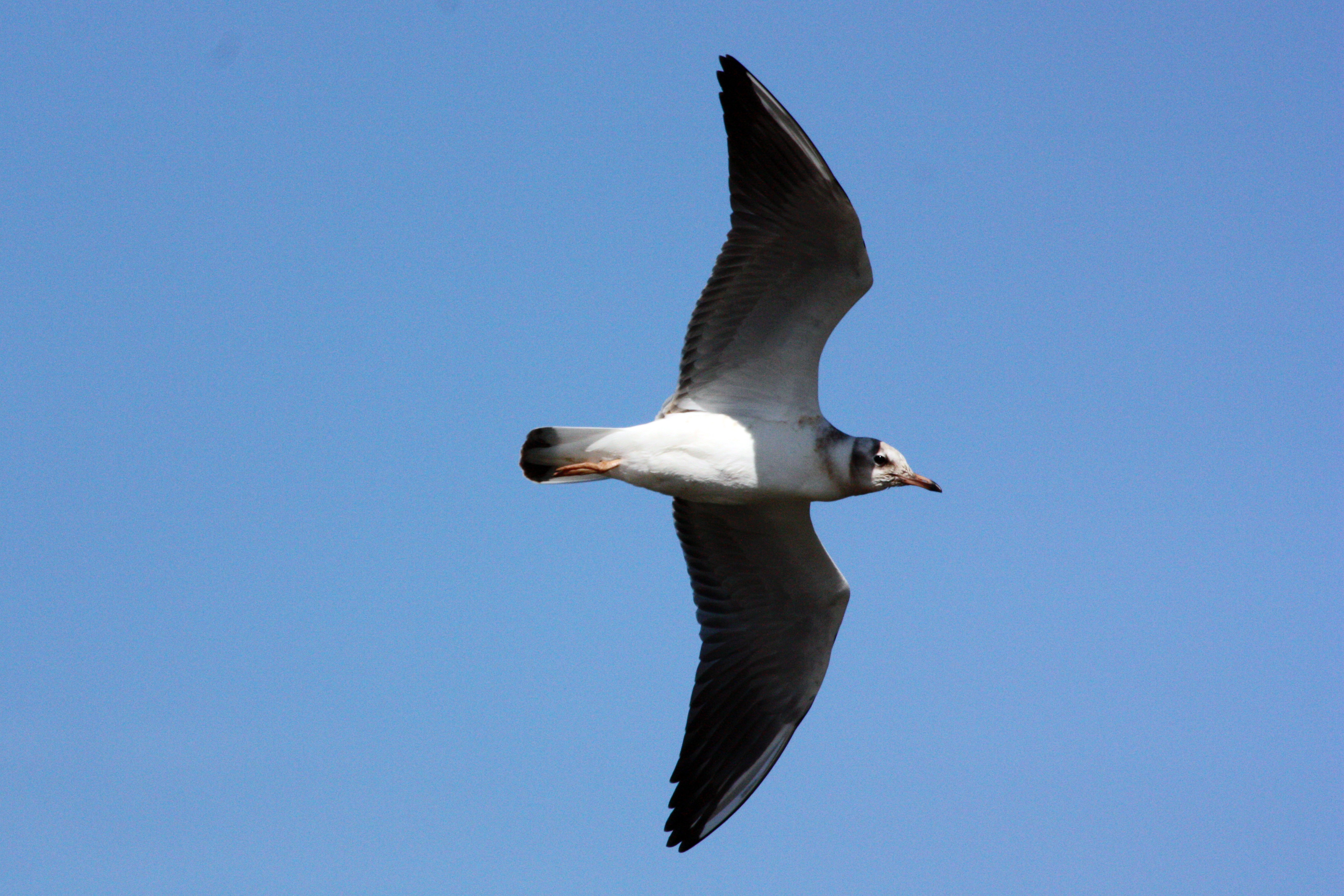
Juvenile at Farmoor Reservoir, Oxfordshire

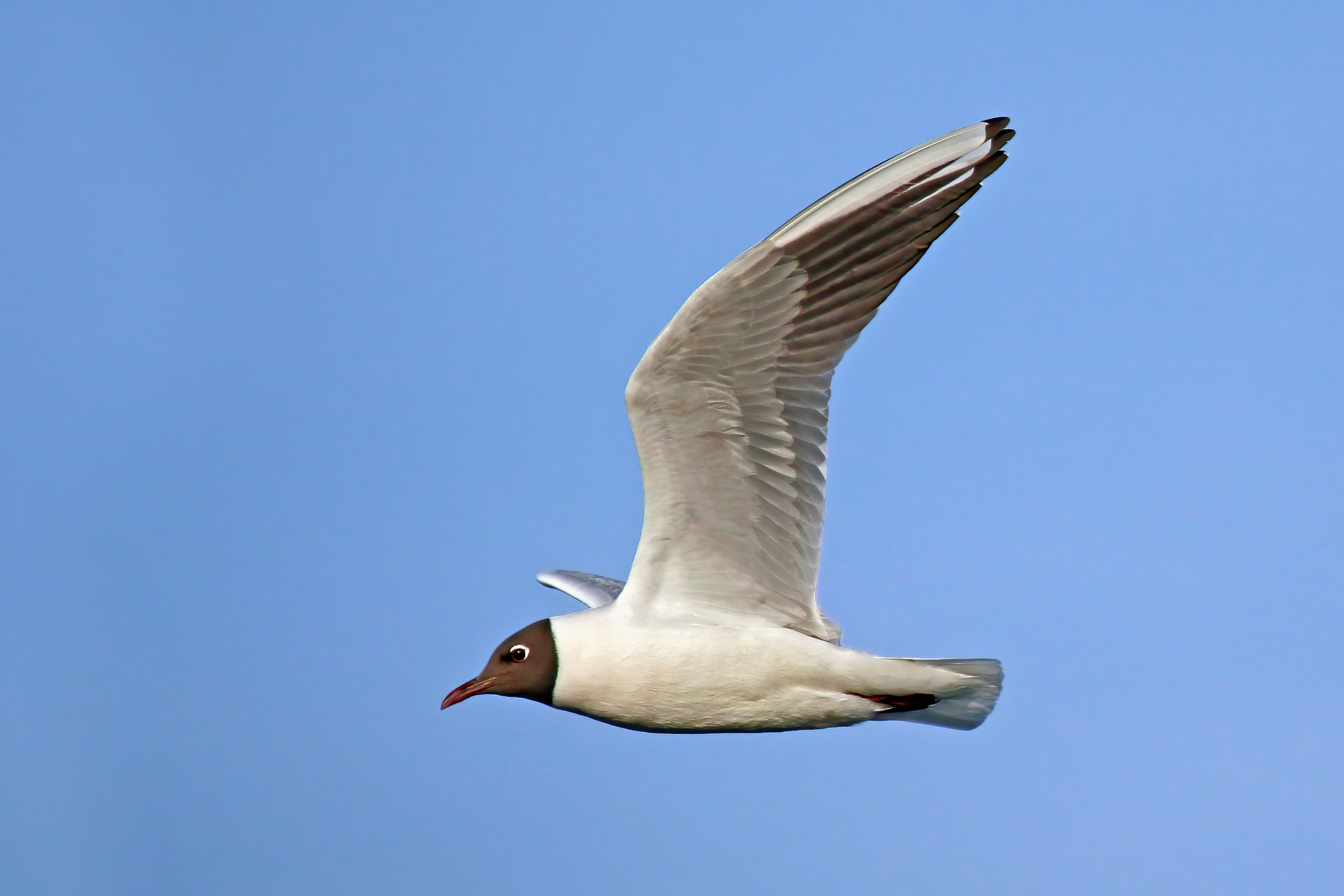
At Farmoor Reservoir, Oxfordshire

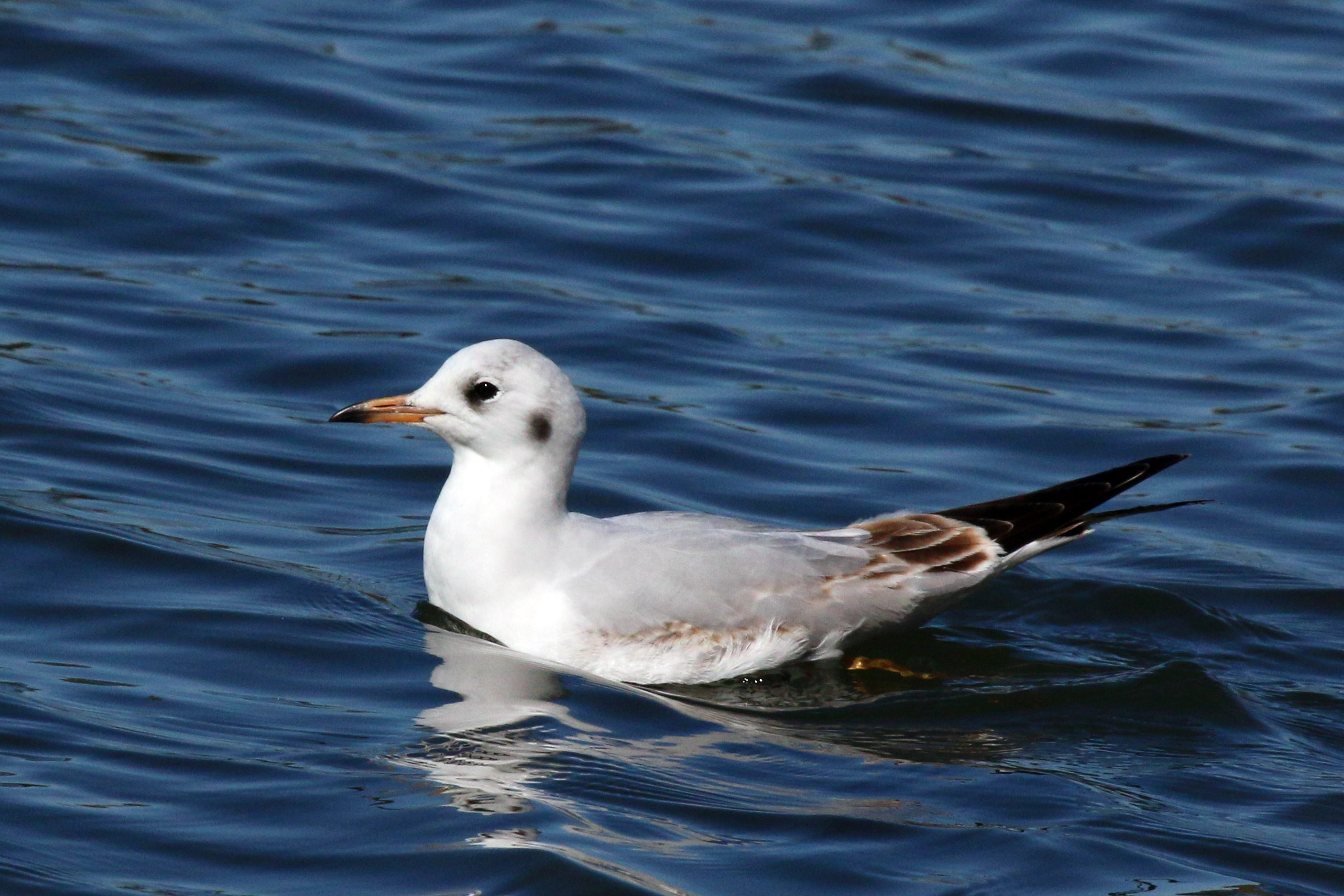
First winter plumage, at Blenheim Palace, Oxfordshire

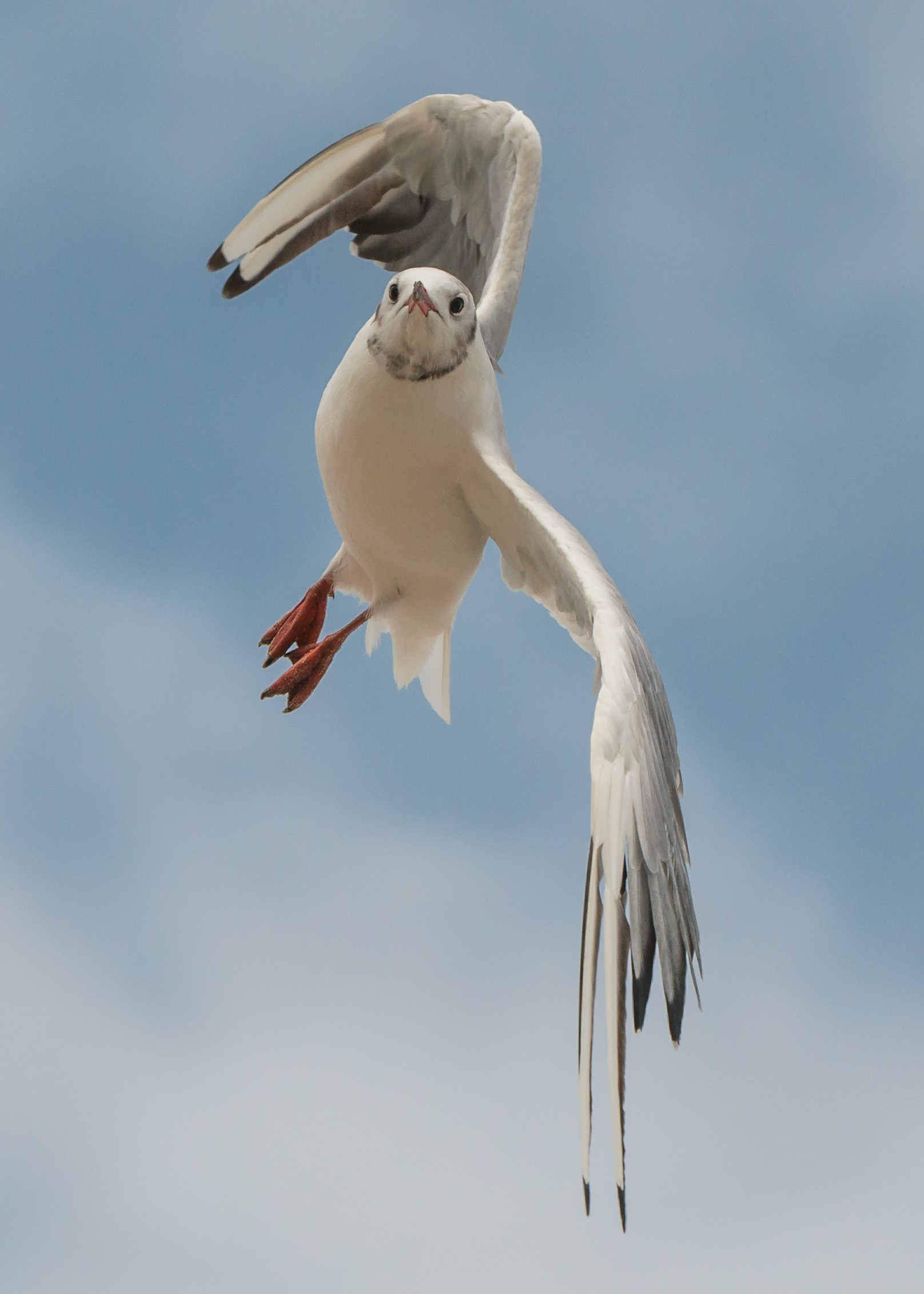
In flight near Großenbrode, Schleswig-Holstein; the bird is in a near-vertical position

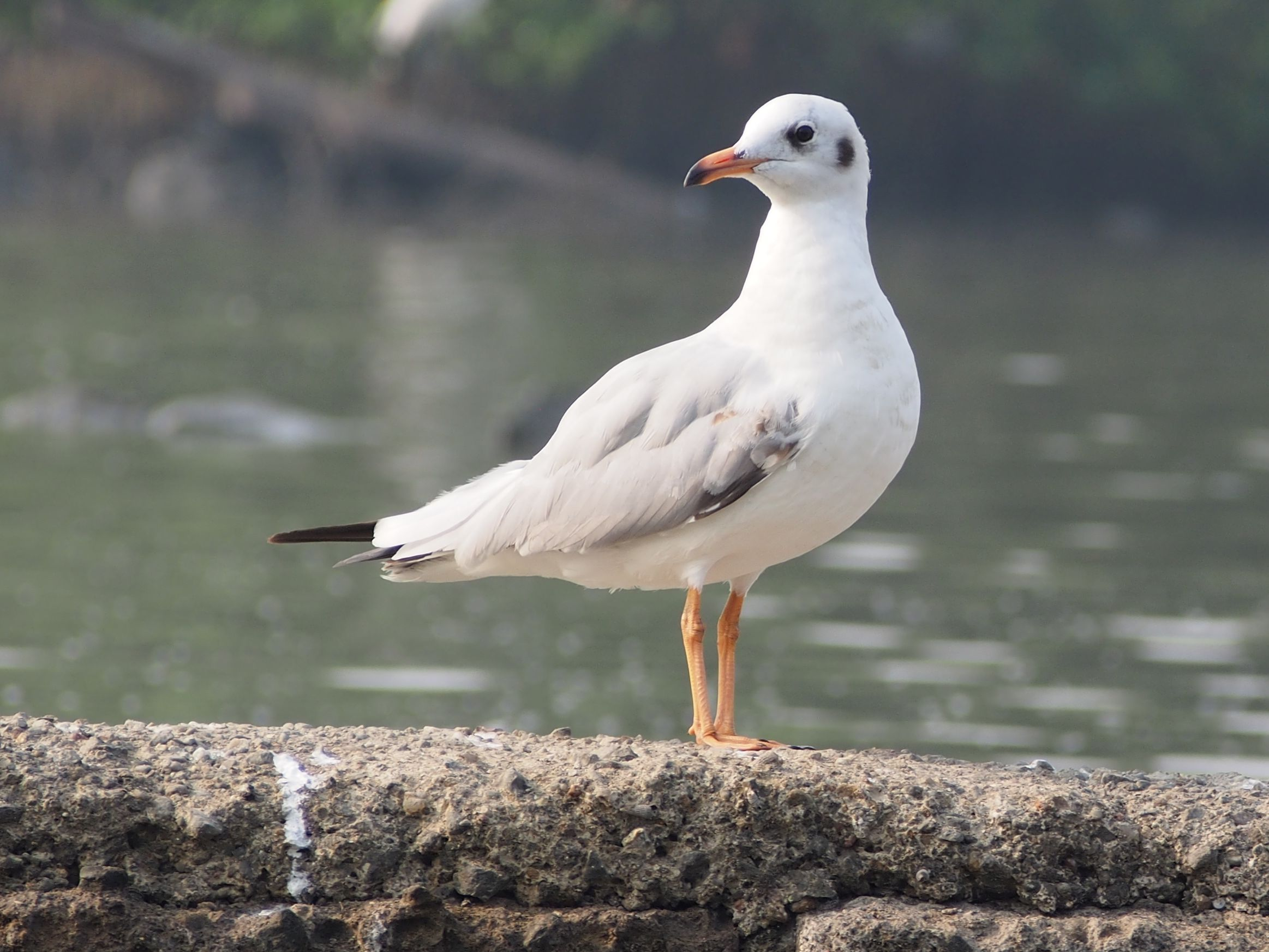
From Navi Mumbai, India

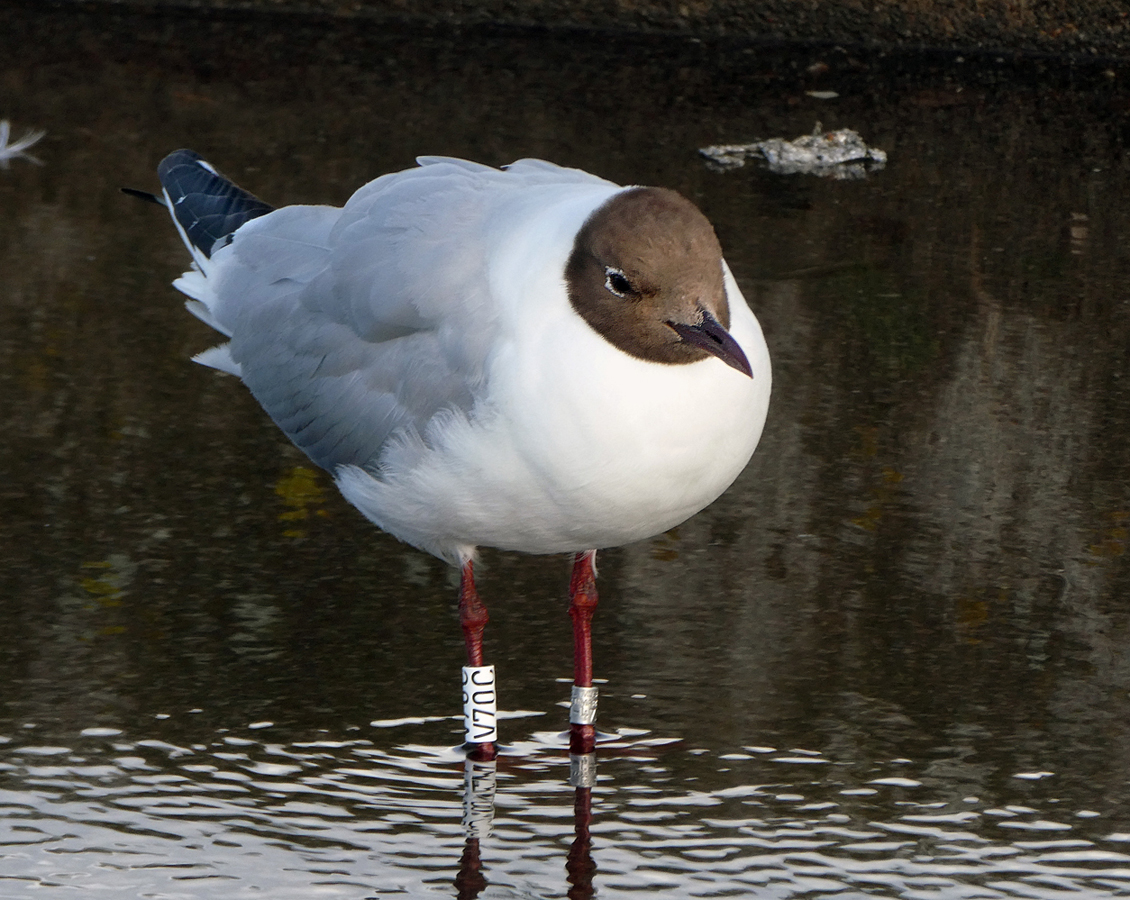
Ringed adult in summer

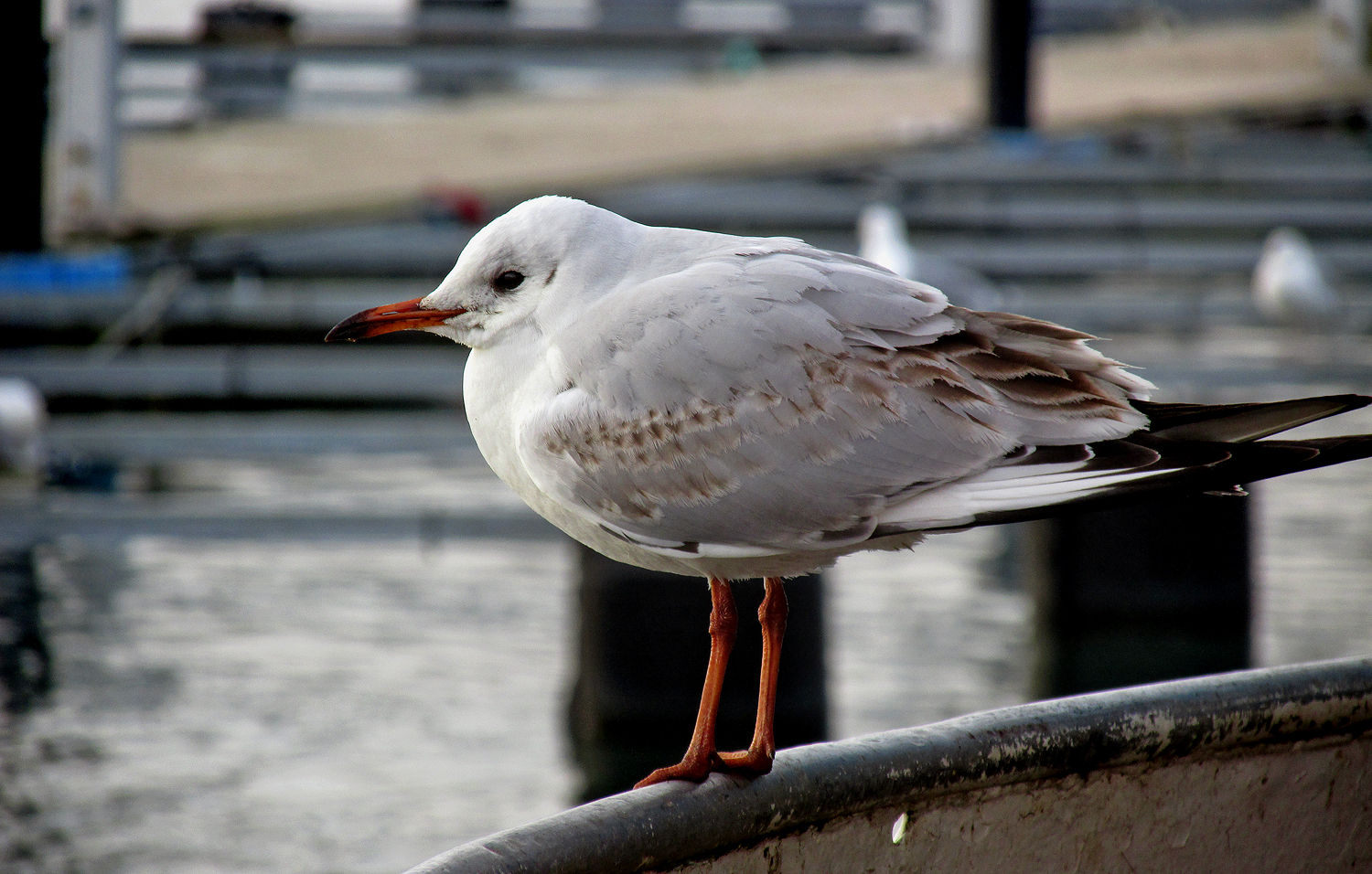
Juvenile first winter

Black-headed gulls foraging on insects

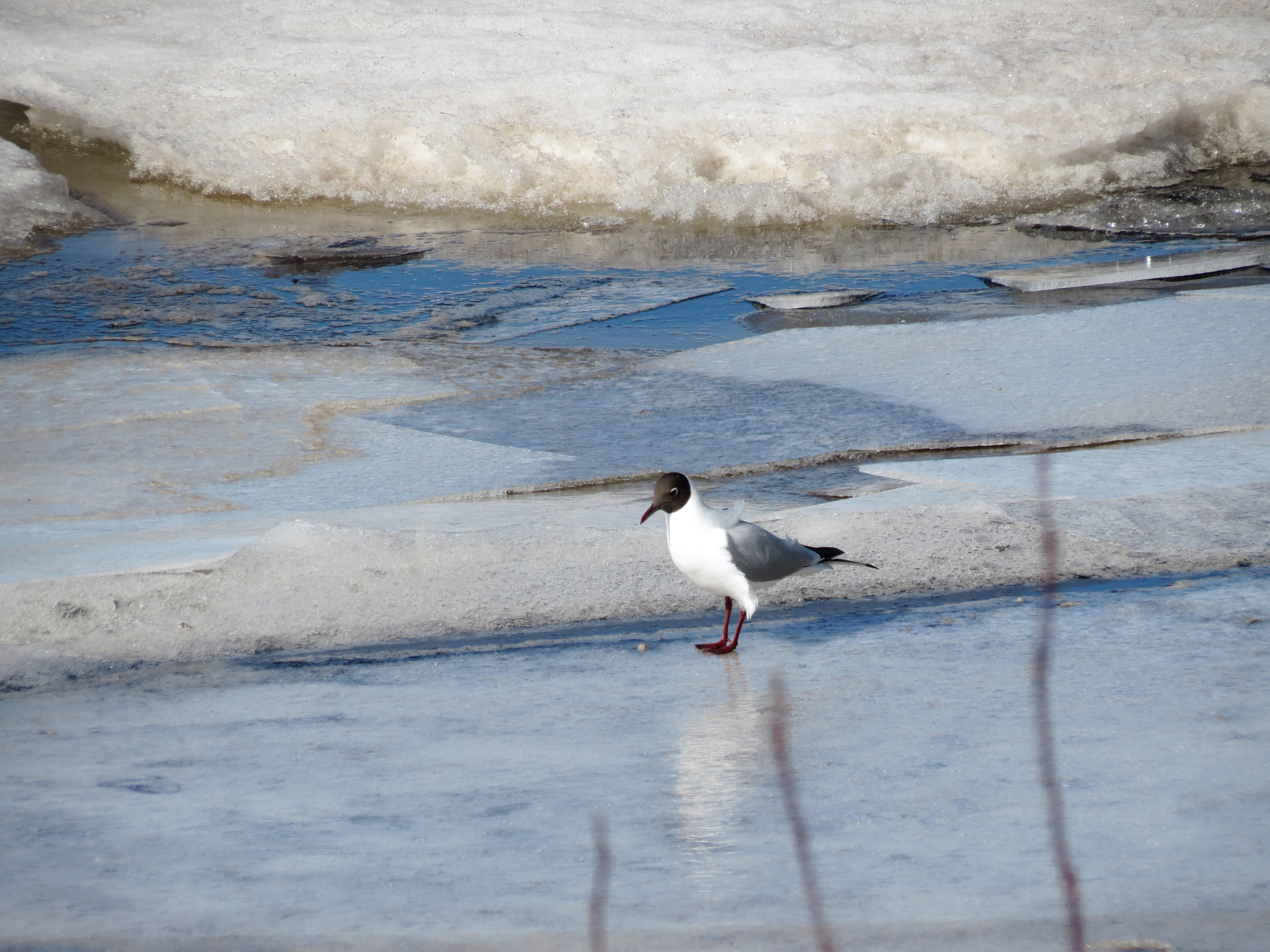
Black-headed gull standing on ice in Ämmänväylä, Oulu, Finland

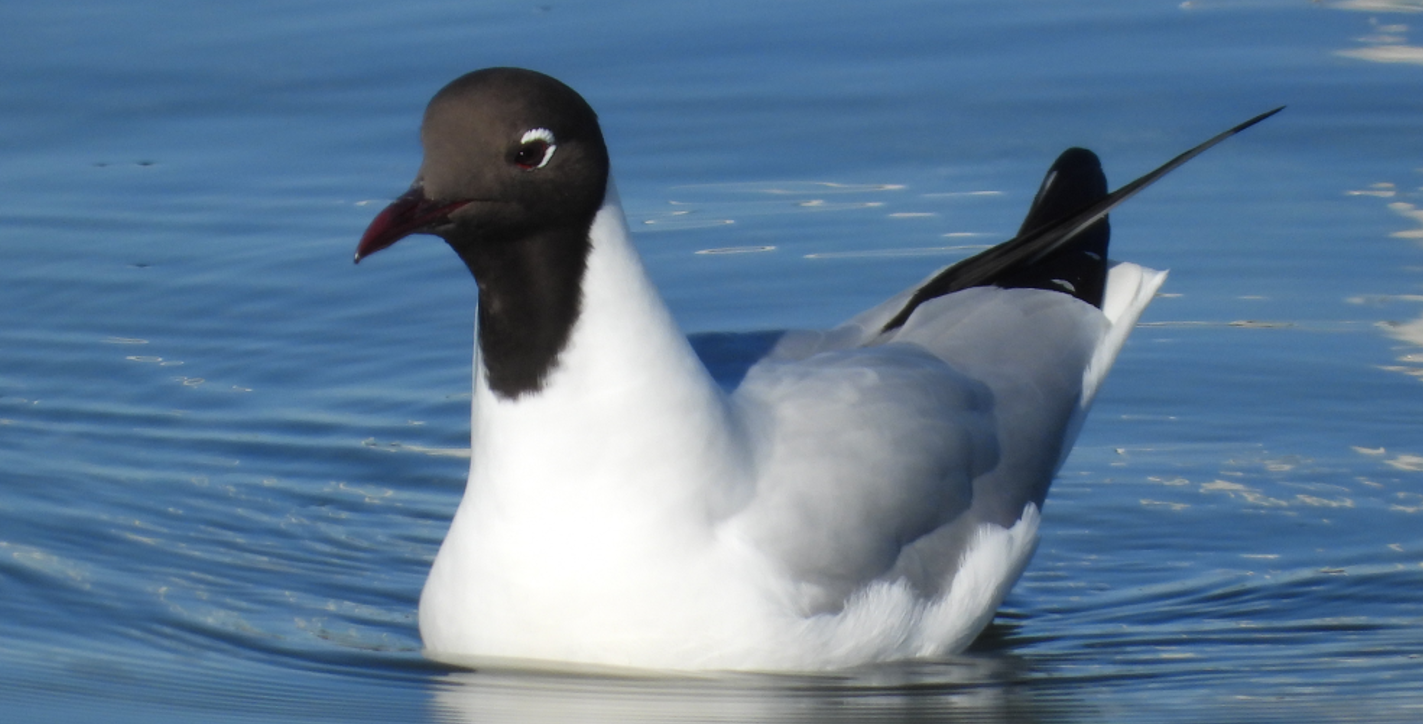
A black-headed gull seen from West Sussex, England.

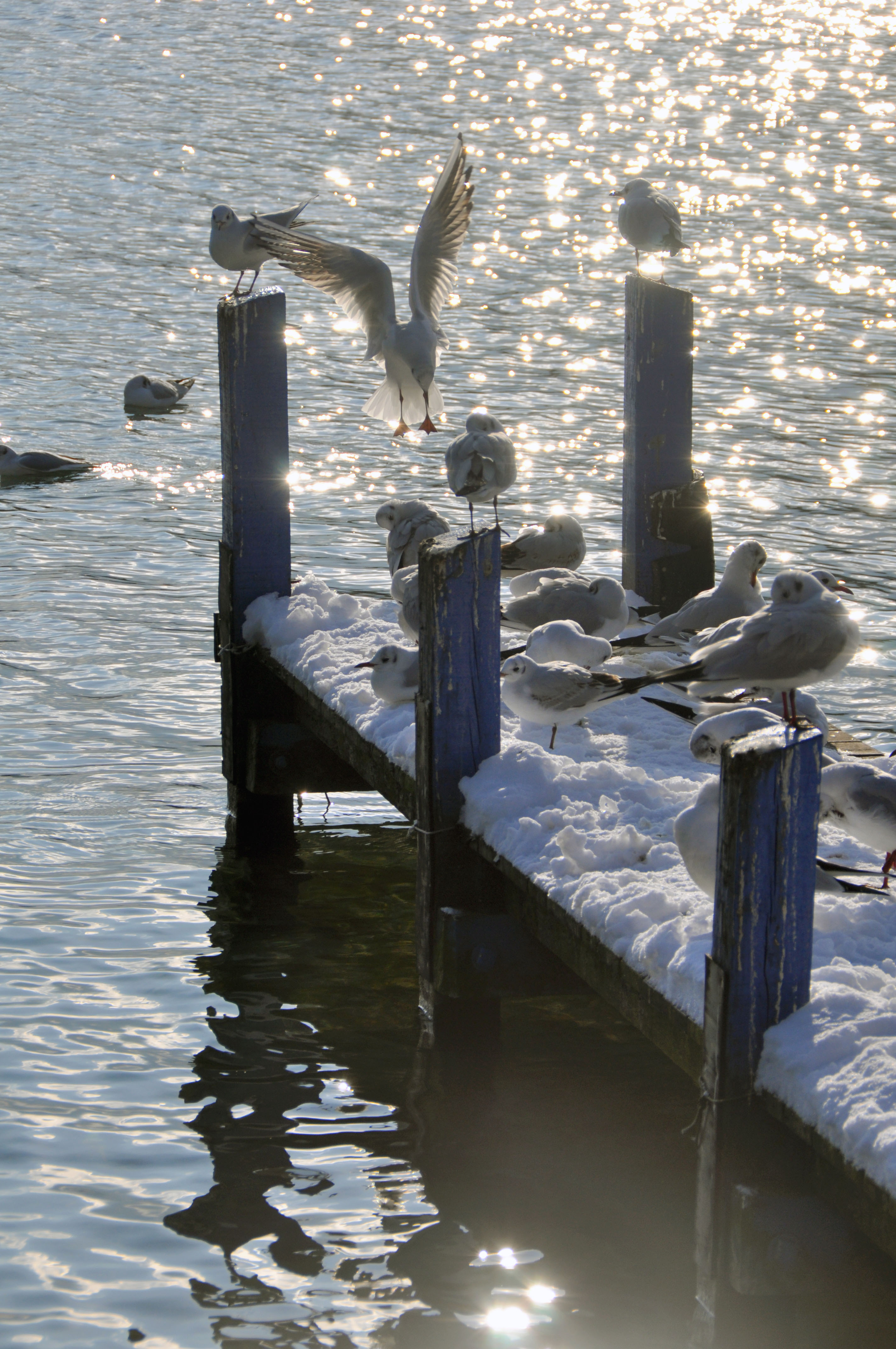
Group of black-headed gulls in winter, France
