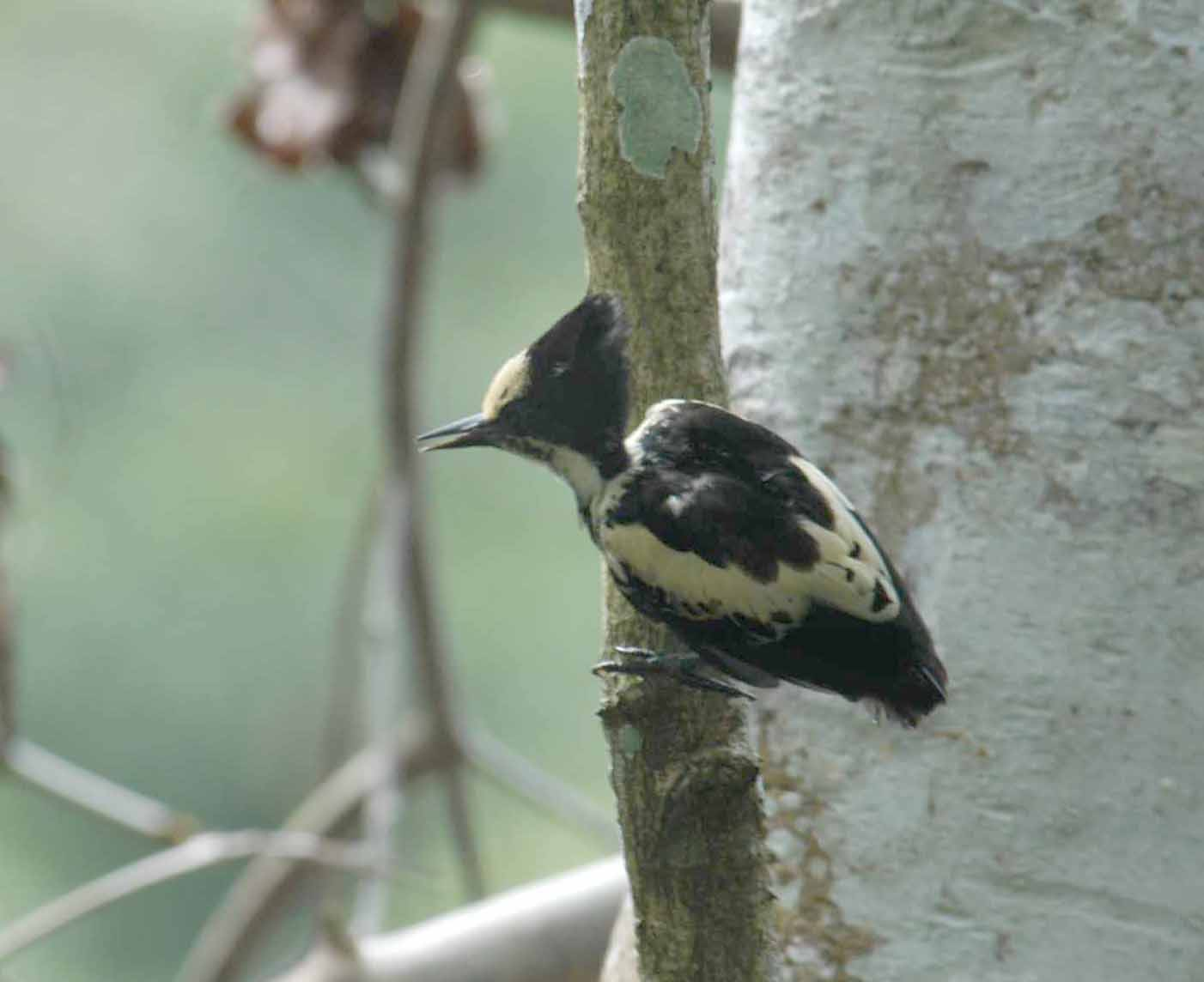
- Heart-spotted woodpecker (Hemicircus canente)

Scientific classification
- Kingdom: Animalia
- Phylum: Chordata
- Class: Aves
- Order: Piciformes
- Family: Picidae
- Tribe: Hemicircini
- Genus: Hemicircus; Swainson, 1837

Type species
- Picus concretus Temminck, 1821

Species
- see text

Synonyms
- Hemicercus

= Hemicircus =

Genus of birds

Hemicircus is a genus of birds in the woodpecker family Picidae. Members of the genus are found in India and Southeast Asia.

These are small woodpeckers with short tails. The plumage is mainly black and white.

The genus was introduced in 1837 by the English naturalist William Swainson with the grey-and-buff woodpecker (Hemicircus concretus) as the type species. The genus name combines the Ancient Greek 'hēmi meaning "half" or "small" and kerkos meaning "tail".

== Species ==
The genus contains two species:

Genus Hemicircus – Swainson, 1837 – two species
Common name	Scientific name and subspecies	Range	Size and ecology	IUCN status and estimated population
Grey-and-buff woodpecker	Hemicircus sordidus (Temminck, 1821) Two subspecies: H. c. sordidus (Eyton, 1845); H. c. concretus (Temminck, 1821)	Malay Peninsula, Sumatra, Borneo and Java	Size: Habitat: Diet:	LC
Heart-spotted woodpecker	Hemicircus canente (Lesson, 1832)	Western Ghats and the forests of central India	Size: Habitat: Diet:	LC
