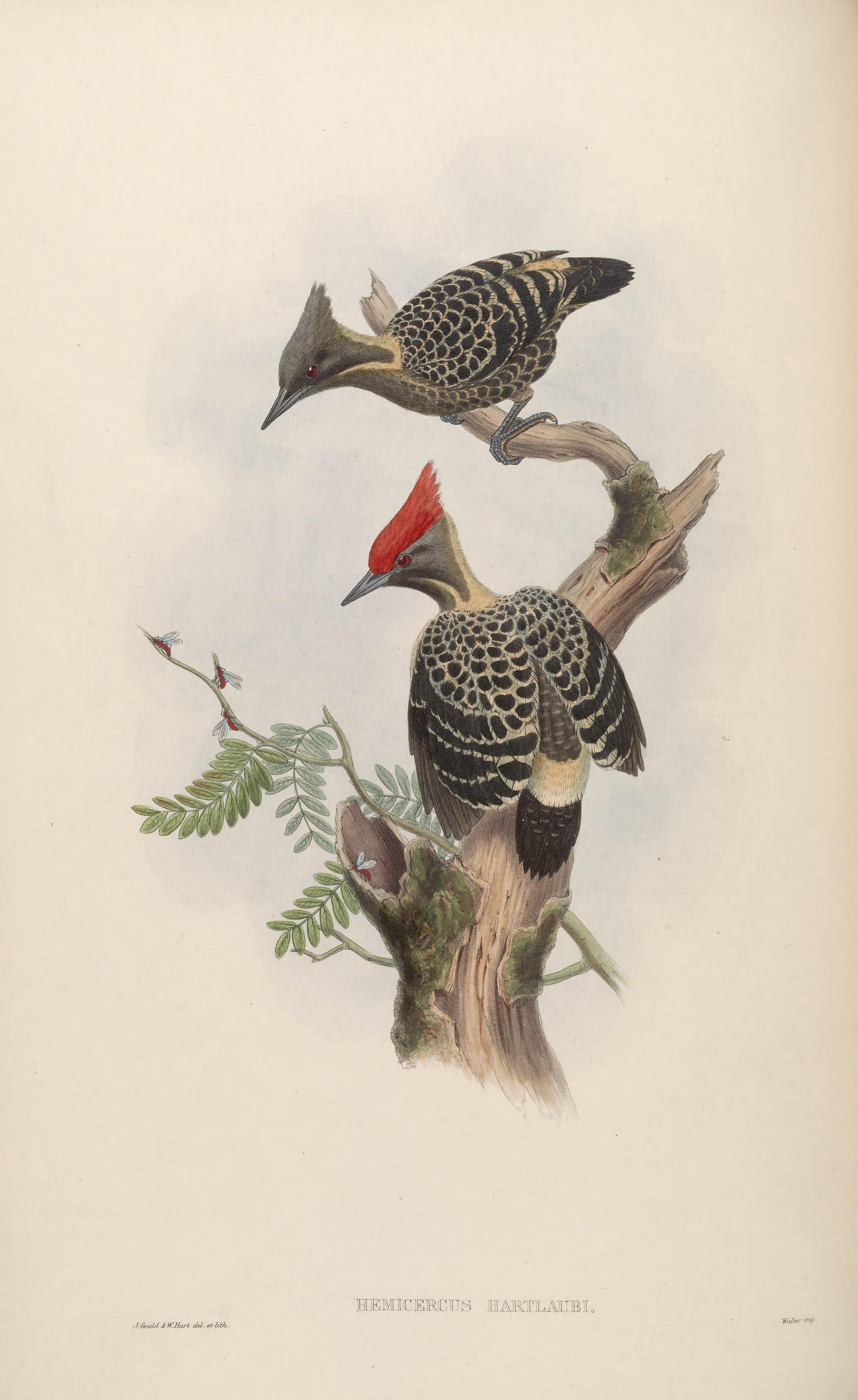

Conservation status
- Least Concern (IUCN 3.1)

Scientific classification
- Kingdom: Animalia
- Phylum: Chordata
- Class: Aves
- Order: Piciformes
- Family: Picidae
- Genus: Hemicircus
- Species: H. concretus

Binomial name
- Hemicircus concretus (Temminck, 1821)

= Grey-and-buff woodpecker =

Species of bird

The grey-and-buff woodpecker (Hemicircus concretus) is a species of bird in the family Picidae. It is found in Brunei, Indonesia (Sumatra and Borneo), Malaysia, southern Myanmar, and southern Thailand, but has become regionally extinct in Singapore. Its natural habitats are lowland and montane tropical or subtropical moist broadleaf forests.

== Taxonomy ==
The grey-and-buff woodpecker was formally described by the Dutch zoologist Coenraad Jacob Temminck in 1821 and given the binomial name Picus concretus. The type locality is western and central Java. The species is now placed in the genus Hemicircus that was introduced in 1837 by the English naturalist William Swainson.

Two subspecies are recognised:

- H. c. sordidus (Eyton, 1845) – Malay Peninsula, Sumatra, Borneo and nearby islands;
- H. c. concretus (Temminck, 1821) – Java.

The species is sometimes split with H. concretus as the red-crested woodpecker and H. sordidus as the grey-and-buff woodpecker.

== Description ==
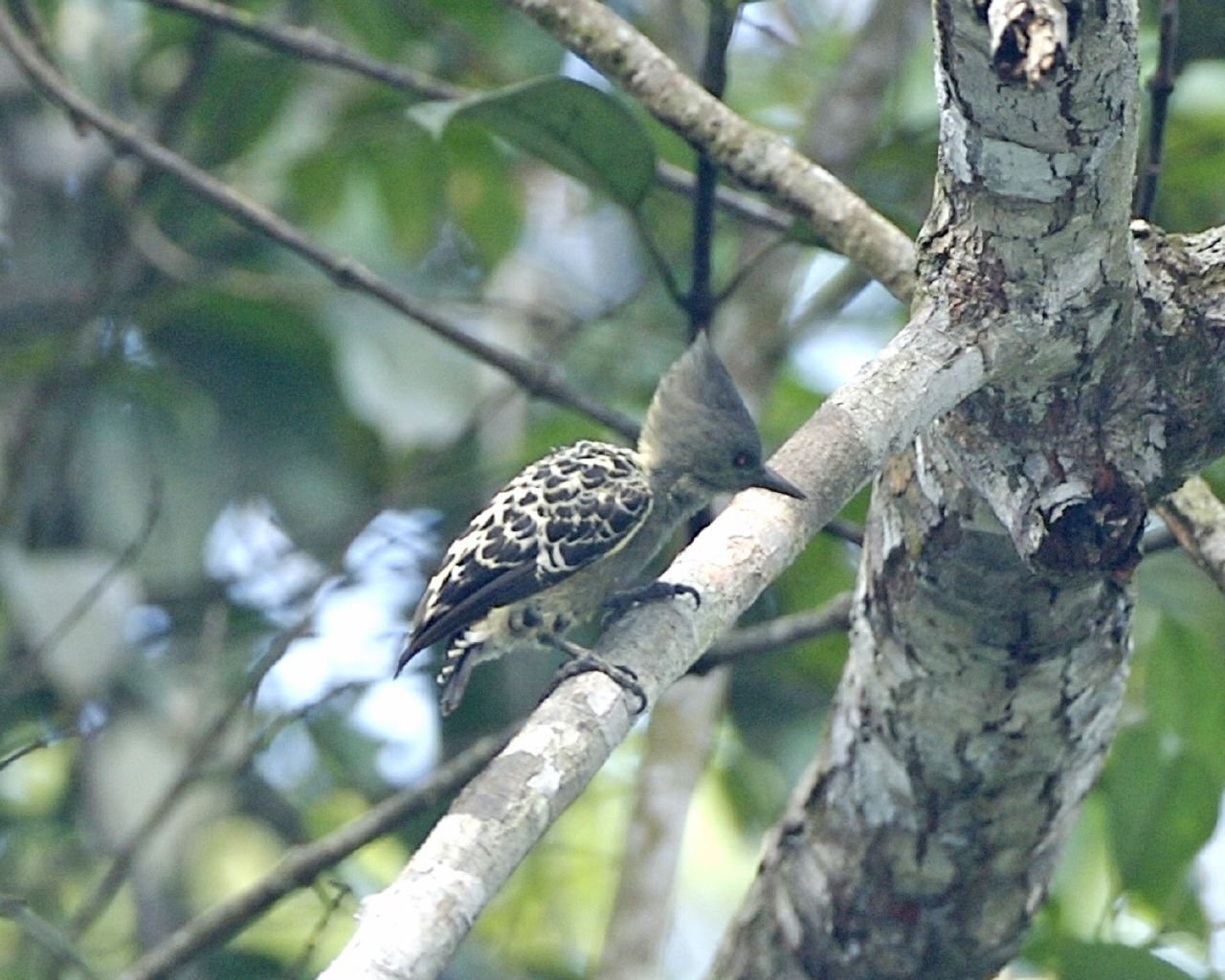
Female with grey forehead

The species has a plump body and short rounded tail, and grows to a length of about 13.5 cm (5.3 in). The head appears large because of the slender neck and the large, cone-shaped crest. The head is largely grey, with a fine white, wavy line running from the cheek to the mantle. In males the forehead is red and the crest grey, while in females, both are grey. Body upper parts and wings are blackish, the feathers being edged with white or buff giving a scalloped effect. Underparts are grey, the tail and underwing dark, and the legs are grey or brown. The beak is long, slender and grey with a black tip, and the iris is chestnut. A gland of unknown function is on the back, the secretions from which sometimes stain the white rump.

== Distribution and habitat ==
This woodpecker is native to tropical southeastern Asia. Its range extends from southern Myanmar and peninsular Thailand and Malaysia, to Sumatra and Borneo. It is a resident species found in lowland and mid-elevation evergreen rainforests, particularly clearings and forest edges, also in plantations, bamboo thickets, cleared areas, wooded urban areas and cultivated land.

== Behaviour and ecology ==
The grey-and-buff woodpecker is usually seen singly or in pairs, but sometimes occurs in mixed species flocks foraging in the canopy. It mainly feeds by gleaning rather than by drilling into the wood, the diet consisting of insects and fruit, including mistletoe (Loranthus) berries. The birds roost communally at night in shallow holes they excavate near each other in dead wood. Nesting takes place in deeper holes or crevices, the breeding season being between December and July.

== Status ==
Although H. concretus occurs in a range of habitats, numbers are thought to be in gradual decline through loss of habitat, and it has become locally extinct in Singapore. It has a very large range and is generally described as being uncommon. The International Union for Conservation of Nature has assessed its conservation status as being of "least concern".
