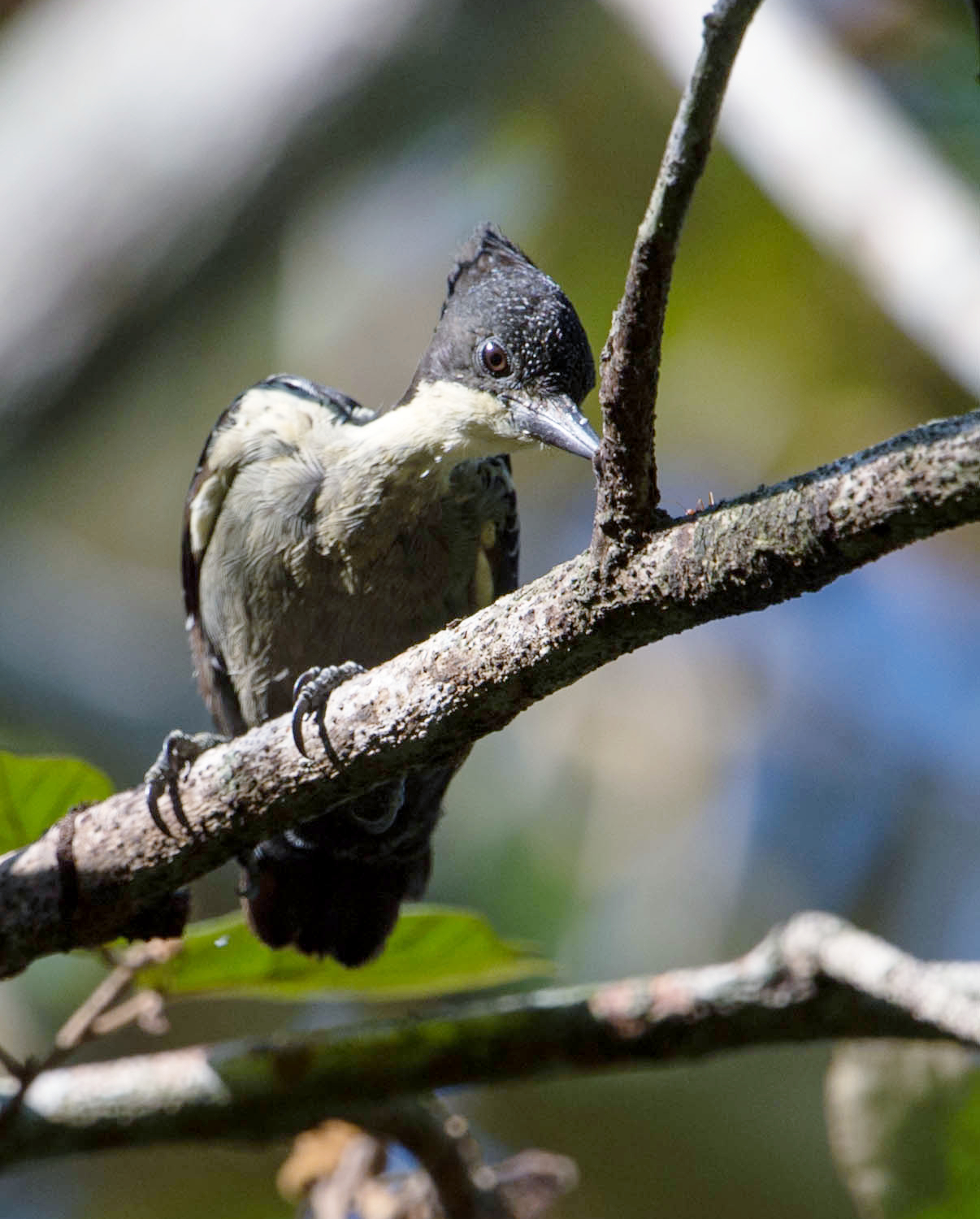
- Male

Conservation status
- Least Concern (IUCN 3.1)

Scientific classification
- Kingdom: Animalia
- Phylum: Chordata
- Class: Aves
- Order: Piciformes
- Family: Picidae
- Genus: Hemicircus
- Species: H. canente

Binomial name
- Hemicircus canente (Lesson, 1832)

Synonyms
- Hemicercus cordatus

= Heart-spotted woodpecker =

Species of bird

The heart-spotted woodpecker (Hemicircus canente) is a species of bird in the woodpecker family. It has a contrasting black and white plumage, a distinctively stubby body and a large wedge-shaped head making it easy to identify while its frequent calling make it easy to detect as it forage for invertebrates under the bark of the slender outer branches of trees. They move about in pairs or small groups and are often found in mixed-species foraging flocks. They have a wide distribution across Asia with populations in the forests of southwestern and central India which are slightly separated from their ranges in the Himalayas and Southeast Asia.

== Taxonomy ==
The heart-spotted woodpecker was described in 1832 by the French naturalist René Lesson from a specimen collected from Bago in Myanmar. He coined the binomial name Picus canente. The specific name is from Roman mythology: Canens was a sweet-voiced nymph, her husband was Picus. The species is now placed in the genus Hemicircus that was introduced in 1837 by the English naturalist William Swainson. The species is monotypic: no subspecies are recognised.

== Description ==
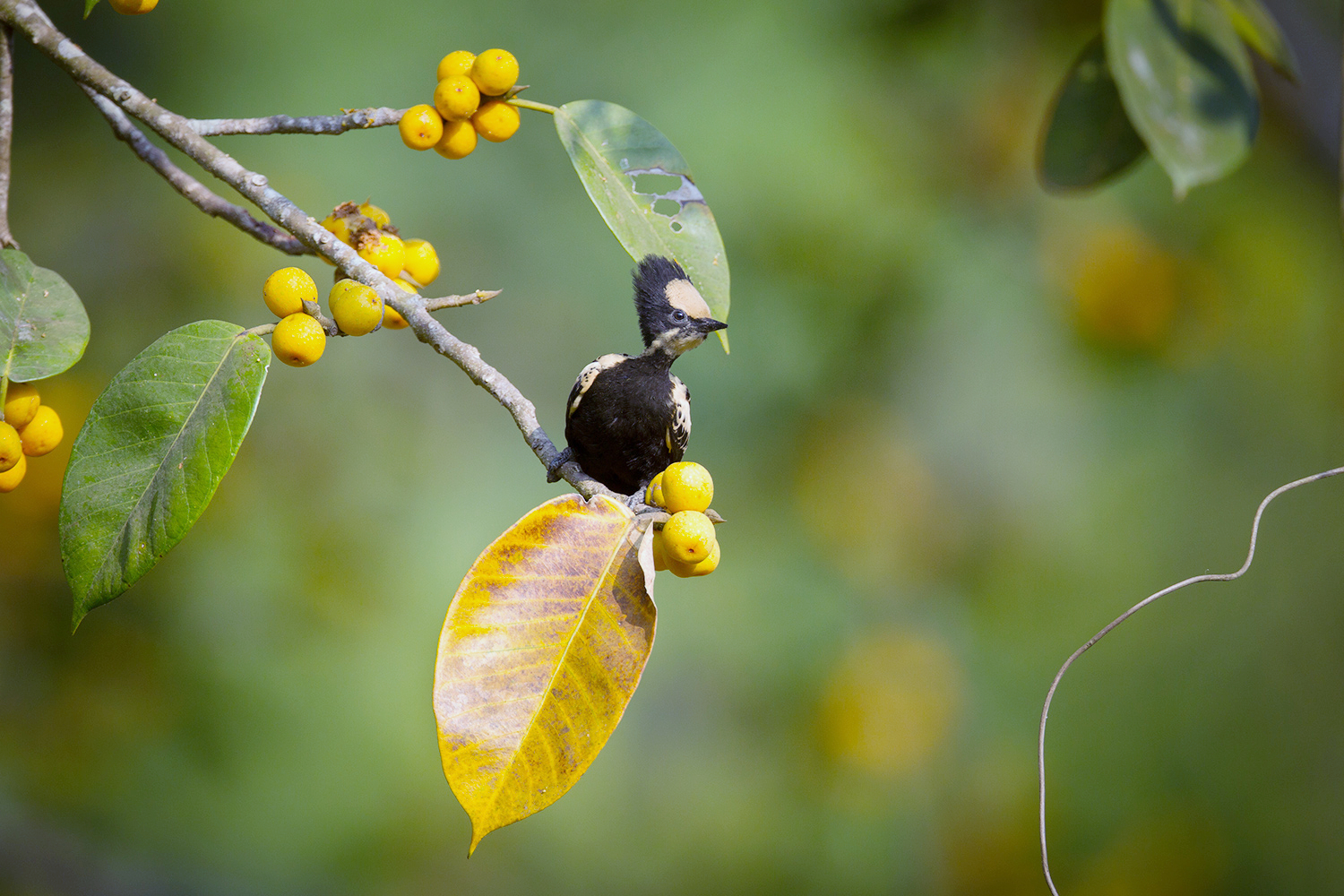
Female heart spotted woodpecker on a fig tree at Dandeli tiger reserve, India

A small, uniquely shaped, black and buff woodpecker with a large crest making the head look large for the short body and tail. Both males and females are predominantly black with heart-shaped black spots on white shoulders with broad white scapular patches and barring of flight feathers. The female has the forehead and crown buffy white while on males it is black with small white dots. The throat is whitish and the underparts are dark olive grey. A tuft of feathers on the back are specialized and are lipid rich which causes the feathers to stick together in preserved specimens. These special feathers or "fat quills" sometimes make the rump feathers appear buff and may be a form of "cosmetic colouration" and the secretion is said to have a pleasant smell but the functional significance is unknown.

== Habitat and distribution ==
Its natural habitat is subtropical or tropical moist lowland forests. They are found in the Himalayan forests of India, and extend into Bangladesh, Myanmar, Thailand, Laos, Cambodia and Vietnam. Within India, they are also found in the Western Ghats and the forests of central India. A subspecies cordatus based on the description by Thomas C. Jerdon from a specimen from the Western Ghats is not considered distinct and the populations differ slightly in plumage colour and vary clinally in size (the northern birds being larger than those closer to the equator).

== Behaviour and ecology ==
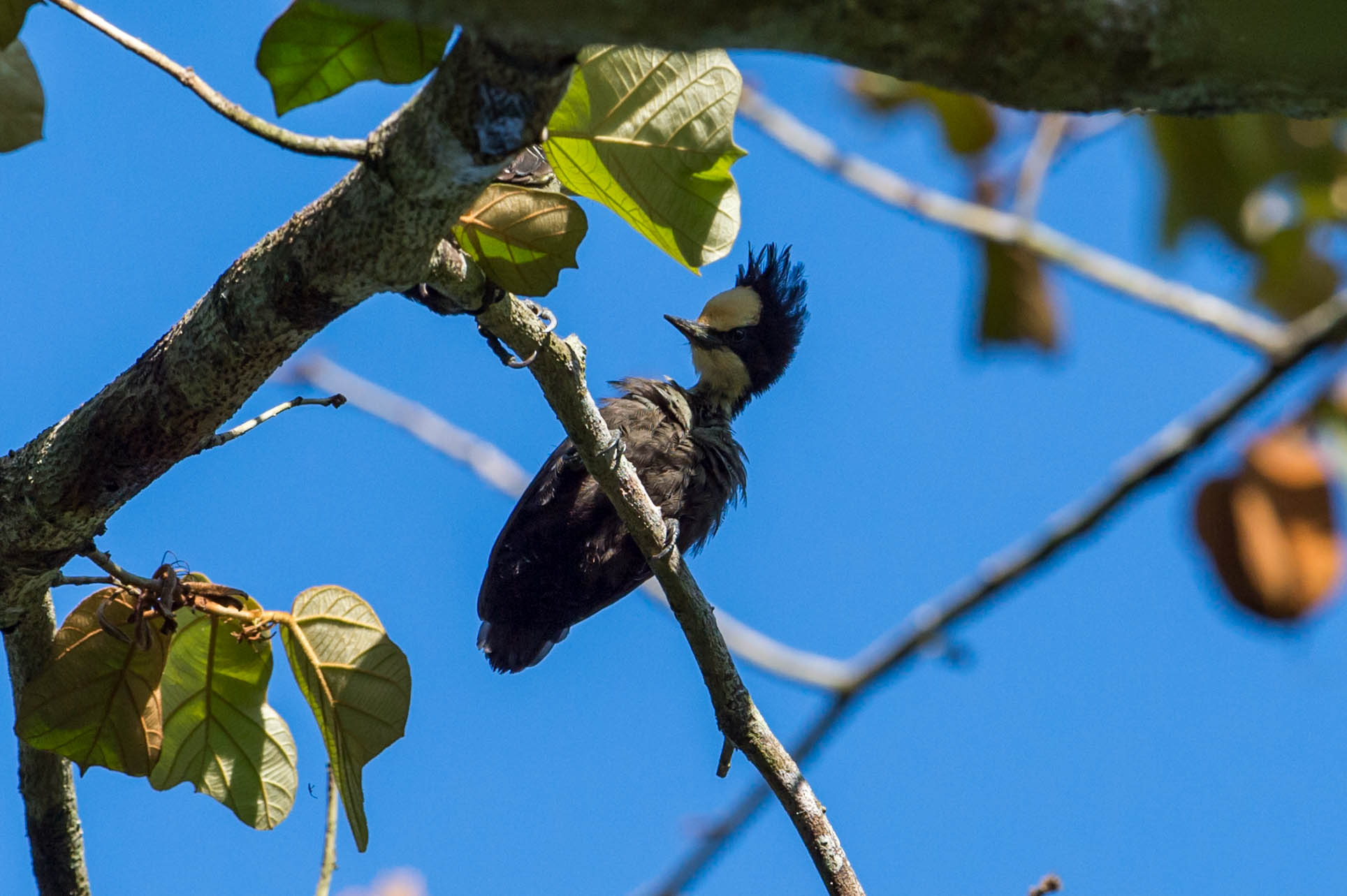
Female

These woodpeckers forage in pairs, sometimes joining mixed-species foraging flocks. They fly from tree to tree in a sharply bounding flight giving a head-heavy appearance. They forage on thin branches and call often. They feed mainly on insects under bark but have been known to peck the pods of Cassia fistula to obtain insect larvae. The calls include a sharp twee-twee-twee (duet call) sometimes leading to a trill of several notes, a nasal ki-yeew and repeated su-sie calls. They drum infrequently during the breeding season, mainly during winter and before the Monsoons. The nest is bored in a dead branch with a narrow 3 to 4 cm diameter opening and the tunnel going down obliquely about 20 cm before widening into a chamber. Nests may sometimes be built in fence posts. The usual clutch is two or three eggs, which are unmarked white. Ticks of the species Haemaphysalis spinigera have been noted on these birds.
