= William Samuel Symonds =

English cleric and geologist

William Samuel Symonds (13 December 1818 – 15 September 1887) was an English cleric, geologist and author.

== Life ==
He was born in Hereford, and educated at Cheltenham College and Christ's College, Cambridge, where he graduated B.A. in 1842. Having taken holy orders he was appointed curate of Offenham, near Evesham in 1843, and two years later he was presented to the living of Pendock in Worcestershire, the advowson of which, together with the lordship of the manor, had been bought by his grandfather, Samuel Beale of Upton-on-Severn. Here he remained until 1877. While at Offenham he became acquainted with HE Strickland and from him developed an interest in natural history and geology, which consumed him from that point. He was one of the founders of the Woolhope Naturalists' Field Club (1851) and of the Malvern Naturalists' Field Club (1853), and was an active member of the Cotteswold Field Club and other local societies.

In 1858 he edited an edition of Hugh Miller's Cruise of the "Betsey." He was the author of numerous essays on the geology of the Malvern country, notably of a paper "On the passage-beds from the Upper Silurian rocks into the Lower Old Red Sandstone at Ledbury" (Quart. Journ. Geol. Soc. 1860). His principal work was Records of the Rocks (1872), indexed by the young Caroline Alice Roberts. He was author of Stones of the Valley (1857), Old Bones, or Notes for Young Naturalists (1859, 2nd ed. 1864), and other popular works including historical romances such as Malvern Chase and Hanley Castle. In 1869, Charlotte Eyton dedicated her book on the geology of North Shropshire to Symonds, acknowledging his encouragement, assistance and suggestions.

He died at Cheltenham on 15 September 1887.

His daughter Hyacinth was the second wife of the Scottish naturalist Sir William Jardine, 7th Baronet, and then the second wife of the great botanist Sir Joseph Dalton Hooker, one of the closest friends of Charles Darwin.

== Publications ==
=== Scientific ===
Old Stones: Notes on Lectures on the Plutonic, Silurian and Devonian Rocks in the Neighbourhood of Malvern, H. W. Lamb (1855).

Geology as it affects a Plurality of Worlds, Rogue and Co. (1856).

Stones of the Valley, Richard Bentley (1857).

Old Bones, Or, Notes for Young Naturalists, Robert Hardwicke (1861).

Records of the Rocks, John Murray (1872).

=== Novels ===
Malvern Chase. An episode of the wars of the Roses and the Battle of Tewkesbury. An Autobiography, William North (1881).

Hanley Castle. An Episode of the Civil Wars and the Battle of Worcester, William North (1883).
