= Charlotte Eyton =

British amateur geologist and author (1838–1917)

- Born: September 1838; Eyton upon the Weald Moors, Shropshire, United Kingdom
- Died: 6 June 1917 (aged 78); Torquay, Devon, United Kingdom
- Known for: Geology of North Shropshire and the Wrekin
- Relatives: Robert Aglionby Slaney (grandfather)

Elizabeth Charlotte Eyton (September 1838 – 6 June 1917) was a British amateur geologist who published a number of articles on the geology of North Shropshire and the Wrekin from 1862 to 1870.

== Early life ==
Charlotte Eyton was born in September 1838 in Shropshire. She was the daughter of Thomas Campbell Eyton, who was a well-known naturalist, and Elizabeth Frances Slaney, an heiress and daughter of Robert Aglionby Slaney. Eyton had six siblings, and never married. Eyton's parents lived at Eyton Hall, in Eyton upon the Weald Moors, near Wellington, Shropshire, and were well connected with prominent natural historians of the mid-19th century, including Charles Darwin and Albert Günther.

== Writings on geology ==
In the 1860s and 1870s, Eyton published a number of articles and books on aspects of the geology of Shropshire. Her first publication was a pamphlet titled The rocks of the Wrekin and what is written upon them, which she published anonymously in 1862. In this pamphlet she explained how she came to write this 'first-born child', through her enjoyment of geology as a pastime, and a desire to share some facts on the geology of Shropshire as deduced by various authors, including geologists Roderick Murchison and Hugh Miller, along with some notes from the scriptures. This volume was published by Wellington bookseller Robert Hobson, and printed by London printers Houlston and Wright. In 1869, she published a book titled Notes on the Geology of North Shropshire, which was described by a reviewer as a 'very nice little book .. on the Geology .. of the Wrekin and part of the plain of North Shropshire'. Eyton dedicated this book to William Symonds, a curate, geologist and natural historian who had written a number of essays on the geology of the nearby Malvern Hills.

Following the publication of this book, Eyton published two technical journal articles in the Geological Magazine on the Pleistocene-age shell-bearing gravels and blue clay deposits of Shropshire.

In 1872, Eyton published a popular book on natural science, By Flood and by Fell. This books received mixed reviews. The Popular Science Review declared that, while useful as a child's book, the style was rather too grandiose for the audience, while the Illustrated Review thought it a 'charming and useful little work', which attempted to blend religious and scientific ideas.

== Other writings ==
In 1868, Eyton published a short pamphlet, Hymns of Praise and Prayer, with profits intended to be used for the relief of the distress in the East End of London, following the 1866 cholera outbreak.

Later in her life, Eyton moved to Torquay, Devon. She died on 6 June 1917.

== Published works ==
=== Articles ===
- Eyton, Charlotte (1870) On The Pleistocene Deposits of North Shropshire, Geological Magazine 7, 106–113.
- Eyton, Charlotte (1870) On the Age and Geological Position of the Blue Clay of the Western Counties, Geological Magazine 7, 545–547.

=== Books and pamphlets ===
- Eyton, C. (1862) The rocks of the Wrekin, and what is written upon them, by a lady, published by R. Hobson, Wellington, Salop; printed by Houlston and Wright, London, 48 pp.
- Eyton, Charlotte (1868) Hymns of Praise and Prayer, published by R. Hobson, Wellington, Salop, 19 pp.
- Eyton, Charlotte (1869) Notes on the Geology of North Shropshire Robert Hardwicke, London, 88 pp.
- Eyton, Charlotte (1872) By Flood and by Fell; or, Causes of Change, Organic and Inorganic, in the Material World G. T. Goodwin, London, 127 pp.
