= Thomas Campbell Eyton =

English naturalist (1809–1880)

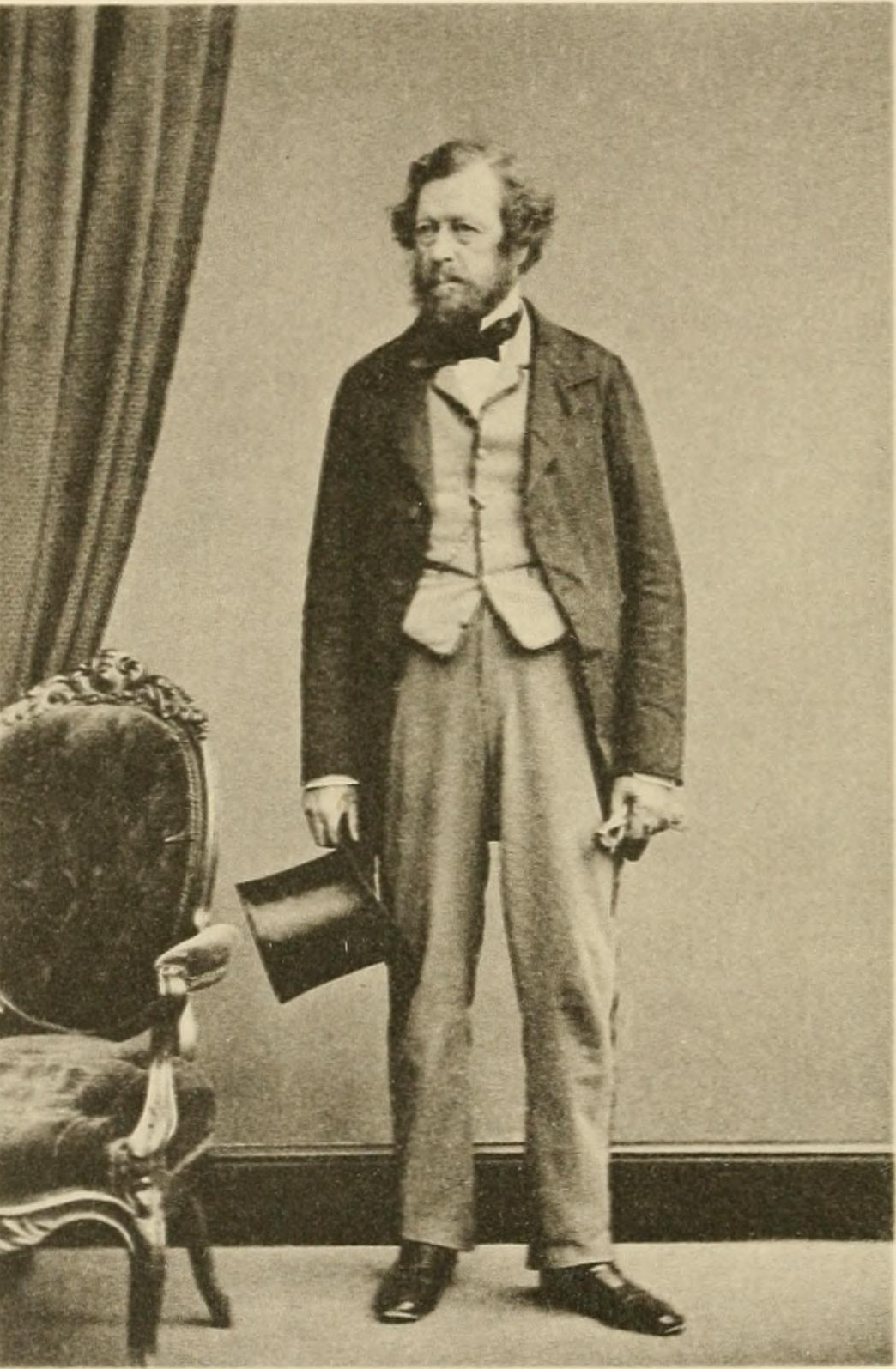
- Born: 10 September 1809; Eyton Hall, Shropshire, England
- Died: 25 October 1880 (aged 71)
- Education: St John's College, Cambridge
- Known for: History of the Rarer British Birds, Natural history museum at Eyton
- Spouse: Elizabeth Frances Slaney
- Children: Charlotte Eyton
- Relatives: Robert Aglionby Slaney (father-in-law)
- Scientific career
- Author abbrev. (zoology): Eyton

Thomas Campbell Eyton JP, DL (10 September 1809 – 25 October 1880) was an English naturalist whose fields were cattle, fishes and birds. He was a friend and correspondent of Charles Darwin though he opposed his theories.

Eyton was born at Eyton Hall, near Wellington, Shropshire. He studied at St John's College, Cambridge, where he was a contemporary and friend of Charles Darwin.

In 1851 he formed both Wellington's town Waterworks Company, and Wellington Coal and Gas Light Company, to provide street lighting within 5 miles radius of the town.

After succeeding to the estate in 1855, Eyton built a large natural history museum at Eyton Hall that included a range of bird skins and skeletons, described as "one of the finest in Europe". Besides Darwin, Eyton enjoyed some correspondence with other naturalists including Louis Agassiz, Asa Gray, and Alfred Russel Wallace.

Eyton published History of the Rarer British Birds (1836), A Monograph on the Anatidae, Or Duck Tribe (1838), A History of Oyster and Oyster Fisheries (1858) and Osteologia Avium (1871–78). He established in about 1842 the Herd Book of Hereford Cattle, which he edited until 1860

Eyton was married in 1835 to Elizabeth Frances Slaney, the eldest daughter and co-heiress of Robert Aglionby Slaney MP. She pre-deceased him by ten years.

He was a justice of the peace (JP) and a deputy lieutenant of Shropshire. He served in the South Salopian Yeomanry Cavalry, entering as cornet in 1830, and promoted lieutenant in 1838. He also played county level cricket for Shropshire between 1844 and 1854.

Eyton's daughter, Charlotte Eyton was an amateur geologist, who wrote on the geology of the Wrekin.

== Archives ==
A collection of letters sent to Eyton are held at the Cadbury Research Library, University of Birmingham. This archive collection also contains the correspondence of his father-in-law, Robert Aglionby Slaney, and other family members.
