= Flicker =

Flicker may refer to:

== Animals ==
- Flickers, woodpeckers of the subgenus Colaptes
  - Examples include: Andean flicker, Bermuda flicker (extinct), campo flicker, Chilean flicker, Fernandina's flicker, gilded flicker, and northern flicker

== Engineering and science ==
- Flicker (light), a perceptible change in brightness of a light source
- Flicker (screen), a darkness artifact that occurs on a video display not present in source material
- Flicker noise, electrical noise with a 1/f spectrum
- Flickering, possible behavior of a complex dynamical system as it approaches a critical transition
- Power-line flicker, a fluctuation in the voltage of AC power lines, whose compliance is regulated by IEC61000-3-3

== People ==
- Flicker (surname), includes a list of notable people with the surname
- Flicker, the original bass guitarist for the band Manic Street Preachers

== Popular culture ==
=== Books ===
- Flicker (novel), by Theodore Roszak

=== Fictional characters ===
- Flicker, a character in the cartoon and video game Blazing Dragons
- Flicker, a character in The Ice King of Oz and subsequent books by Eric Shanower

=== Movies ===
- Flicker (film) (stylized as FLicKeR), a 2008 Canadian film
- The Flicker, an experimental film created in 1965 by Tony Conrad

=== Music ===
- Flicker, the sophomore album by Ayria
- Flicker (album), the debut studio album by Niall Horan; also the name of the title track
- "Flicker" (song), a song by Porter Robinson from the album Worlds
- "Flicker", a song by Audio Adrenaline from the album Some Kind of Zombie
- "Flicker", a song by Itzy from the EP Tunnel Vision
- "Flicker", a song by Poppy from the album Zig
- Flicker Records, a record label belonging to Sony

=== Television ===
- "Flicker" (American Horror Story), seventh episode of the fifth season of the anthology television series American Horror Story

== Slang ==
- A remote control device (especially for televisions)
- A flyswatter

== Other uses ==
- Flicker, a 1973 pinball table made by Bally
- Flicker, a guitar tremolo made by ESP Guitars in the late 1970s and early 1980s
- USS Flicker, several ships of the United States Navy

== See also ==
- Flecker, a surname
- Flick (disambiguation)
- Flicka, a 2006 film based on the book My Friend Flicka
- Flickr, a digital photo sharing website and service
