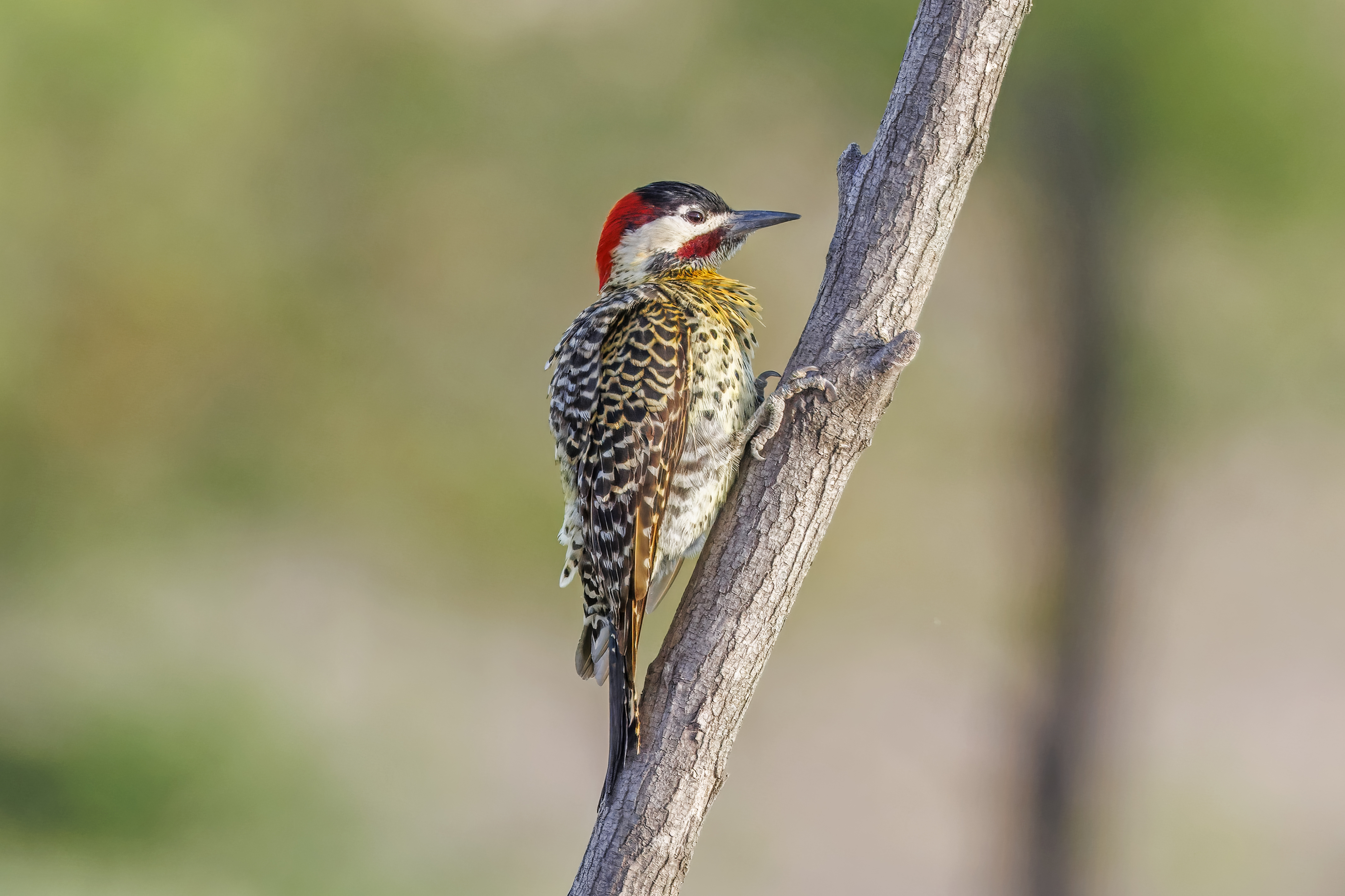
- Male, Uruguay
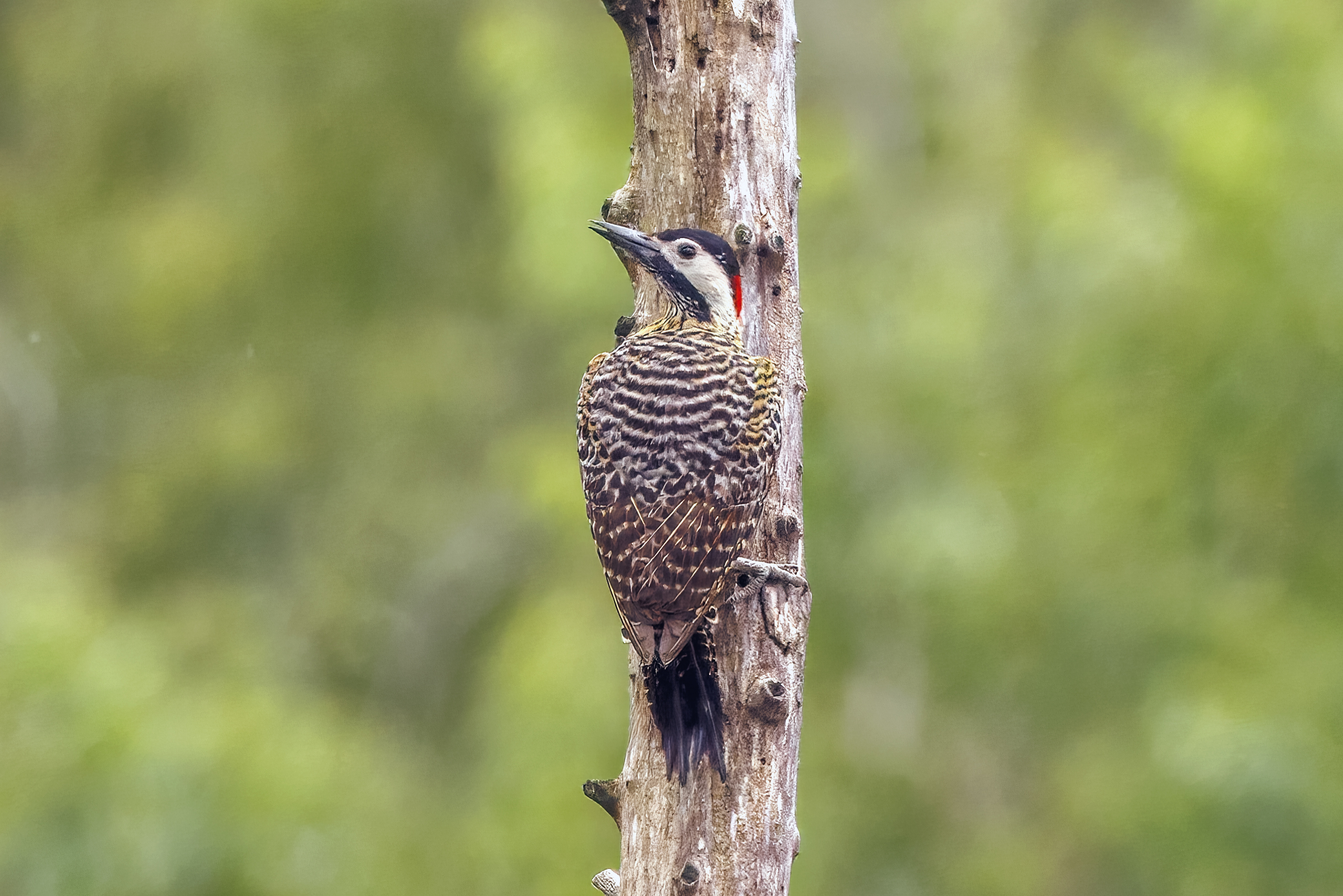
- Female, Argentina both C. m. melanochlorus

Conservation status
- Least Concern (IUCN 3.1)

- Least Concern (IUCN 3.1)

Scientific classification
- Kingdom: Animalia
- Phylum: Chordata
- Class: Aves
- Order: Piciformes
- Family: Picidae
- Genus: Colaptes
- Species: C. melanochloros

Binomial name
- Colaptes melanochloros (Gmelin, JF, 1788)

= Green-barred woodpecker =

Species of bird

The green-barred woodpecker or green-barred flicker (Colaptes melanochloros) is a species of bird in subfamily Picinae of the woodpecker family Picidae. It is found in Argentina, Bolivia, Brazil, Paraguay and Uruguay.

== Taxonomy and systematics ==
The green-barred woodpecker was formally described in 1788 by the German naturalist Johann Friedrich Gmelin in his revised and expanded edition of Carl Linnaeus's Systema Naturae. He placed it with woodpeckers in the genus Picus and coined the binomial name Picus melanochloros. The specific epithet melanochloros combines the Ancient Greek melas meaning "black" with khlōros meaning "green" or "yellow". Gmelin based his description on "Le grand pic rayé de Cayenne" that had been described and illustrated in 1760 by the French polymath Comte de Buffon. Buffon mistakenly believed that his specimen had been collected in Cayenne, French Guiana but the species does not occur there. Instead, the type locality has been designated as Rio de Janeiro in Brazil.

The green-barred woodpecker was moved to the genus Chrysoptilus, but this genus has been merged into Colaptes based on the results of a 2011 molecular phylogenetic study.

The American Ornithological Society, the International Ornithological Committee, and the Clements taxonomy assign these five subspecies to the green-barred woodpecker:

- C. m. melanochloros (Gmelin, 1788)
- C. m. nattereri (Malherbe, 1845)
- C. m. melanolaimus (Malherbe, 1857)
- C. m. nigroviridis (Grant, C.H.B., 1911)
- C. m. leucofrenatus Leybold, 1873

The last three subspecies have in the past been separated as the golden-breasted woodpecker (C. melanolaimus), and BirdLife International's Handbook of the Birds of the World (HBW) retains that treatment. The "green-barred" and "golden-breasted" groups interbreed where they meet. Some authors have also treated C. m. nigroviridis as a separate species.

This article follows the five-subspecies model.

== Description ==
The green-barred woodpecker is 27 to 30 cm (11 to 12 in) long and weighs 80 to 178 g (2.8 to 6.3 oz). Males and females have the same plumage except on their heads. Adult males of the nominate subspecies C. m. melanochloros have a black forehead and forecrown and a red hindcrown and nape. They are white from their lores around the eye to the nape with a red malar stripe below it; their ear coverts have a strong olive tinge. Their chin and throat are whitish green with black streaks. Adult females have red only on the hindcrown and nape; their malar is black with white streaks. Both sexes have yellowish green upperparts with dark brown bars; their rump is paler and less heavily barred and their uppertail coverts are buff with black bars. Their flight feathers are greenish brown with pale barring and olive shafts. The top side of their tail is black and the outer feathers have pale bars. The tail's underside is black with yellowish bars. Their underparts are pale green that is usually darker on the breast with black spots there and on the lower breast and flanks, but usually not on the belly. Their longish bill is black, their iris brown to chestnut-brown, and the legs gray usually with a greenish or yellow tinge.

Subspecies C. m. nattereri is similar to the nominate but smaller and shorter-billed; its plumage is more yellow and the underparts' spots are very small or streaky. The two subspecies are not fully distinct; their plumages intergrade widely. C. m. melanolaimus is more greenish above than the nominate and its rump has less spotting and its tail less barring. It has black markings on the side of the throat and its breast has a golden tinge. C. m. nigroviridis is similar to melanolaimus but still more greenish above; its tail is more strongly barred, its breast less golden, and the underparts' spots are larger. C. m. leucofrenatus is the largest subspecies and the most distinctive. It is brown to golden brown above with whitish barring and a white rump; its breast is golden to orange, its flanks strongly barred, and has large spots or arrowhead-shaped spots on the underparts. These last three also intergrade but less widely than the two "green-barred" subspecies.

The call is a "kwiek-kwik-kwik". Green-barred woodpeckers also make a variety of other notes, singly or in series, "peah, krrew, and peek, and "a screechy wheéo, krrew, pikwarrr, or ker wick." Both sexes drum in "short rolls" but not frequently.

== Distribution and habitat ==
The subspecies of green-barred woodpecker are found thus:

- C. m. melanochloros, southern and southeastern Brazil, southeastern Paraguay, far northeastern Argentina, and much of Uruguay
- C. m. nattereri, from northeastern and south-central Brazil south into eastern Bolivia
- C. m. melanolaimus, central and southern Bolivia
- C. m. nigroviridis, southern Bolivia, western Paraguay, northern and eastern Argentina, and western Uruguay
- C. m. leucofrenatus, northwestern and west-central Argentina

Note that the species map includes only the "green-barred" C. m. melanochloros and C. m. nattereri subspecies.

The green-barred woodpecker inhabits a variety of landscapes from dry desert scrub to subtropical humid forest. Subspecies melanochloros is found mostly in semi-open to open terrain like savanna, open woodland, and arid brushland. The others, especially the northerly subspecies, are also found in less open lowland forests. The species is generally a bird of the lowlands and foothills but reaches 3,000 m (9,800 ft) in Bolivia. As far as is known, it is a year-round resident in most of its range. The southernmost population is at least partly migratory, moving north after the breeding season.

== Behavior ==
=== Feeding ===
The green-barred woodpecker's diet is almost entirely ants including their larvae and pupae. They also eat other insects like termites and Orthoptera. Cactus fruits and several species of berries are also part of the diet, and the species is considered the principal seed disperser of the Myrsinoideae family Myrsine lancifolia and Myrsine coriacea. The species forages singly or in pairs, sometimes with groups of campo flickers (C. campestris). The three "golden-breasted" subspecies tend to feed more on the ground than the other two, though all do forage in the lower and middle levels of trees.

=== Breeding ===
The green-barred woodpecker's breeding season mostly spans from August to January in the south and is earlier in the north. It excavates a nest cavity, usually in a dead tree or stump but also in a palm, cactus, or utility pole, and typically between 2 and 6 m (7 and 20 ft) above the ground. The clutch size is four eggs; both parents incubate the eggs and provision nestlings. The incubation period, time to fledging, and other details of parental care are not known.

== Status ==
The IUCN follows HBW taxonomy, and so has assessed the "green-barred" and "golden-breasted" woodpeckers separately. Both are considered to be of Least Concern. Both have large ranges and unknown population sizes that are believed to be stable. No immediate threats to either have been identified. The species occurs in many protected areas and is considered to be common or reasonably common in most of its range.
