= Flecker =

Flecker is a German language occupational or topographic surname and may refer to:

- Bruno Flecker (born 1953), Austrian rower
- Florian Flecker (born 1995), Austrian footballer
- Hugo Flecker (1884–1957), Australian medical practitioner
- James Elroy Flecker (1884–1915), British novelist and playwright

== See also ==
- Fleck
- Flicker (disambiguation)
