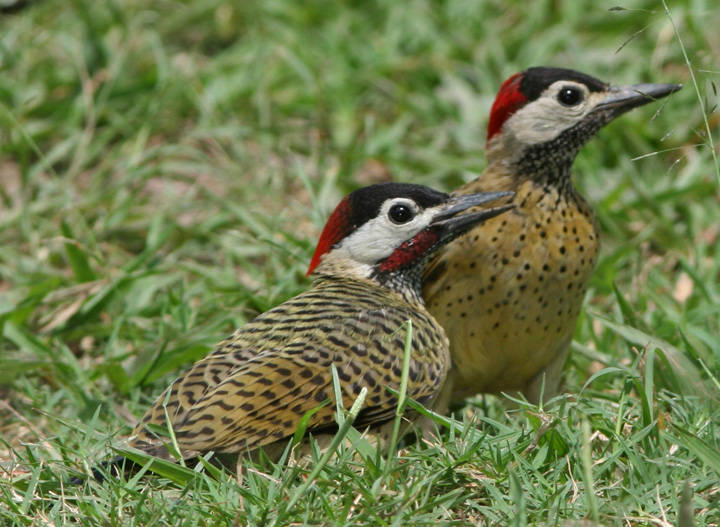

Conservation status
- Least Concern (IUCN 3.1)

Scientific classification
- Kingdom: Animalia
- Phylum: Chordata
- Class: Aves
- Order: Piciformes
- Family: Picidae
- Genus: Colaptes
- Species: C. punctigula

Binomial name
- Colaptes punctigula (Boddaert, 1783)

= Spot-breasted woodpecker =

Species of bird

The spot-breasted woodpecker or spot-breasted flicker (Colaptes punctigula) is a species of bird in subfamily Picinae of the woodpecker family Picidae. It is found in Panama and every mainland South American country except Argentina, Chile, Paraguay, and Uruguay.

== Taxonomy and systematics ==
The spot-breasted woodpecker was described by the French polymath Georges-Louis Leclerc, Comte de Buffon in 1780 in his Histoire Naturelle des Oiseaux from a specimen collected in Cayenne, French Guiana. The bird was also illustrated in a hand-colored plate engraved by François-Nicolas Martinet in the Planches Enluminées D'Histoire Naturelle, which was produced under the supervision of Edme-Louis Daubenton to accompany Buffon's text. Neither the plate caption nor Buffon's description included a scientific name, but in 1783 the Dutch naturalist Pieter Boddaert coined the binomial name Picus punctigula in his catalogue of the Planches Enluminées. For many years, the spot-breasted woodpecker was placed in the genus Chrysoptilus, but it is now placed in the genus Colaptes that was introduced by the Irish zoologist Nicholas Aylward Vigors in 1825. The generic name is from the Ancient Greek kolaptēs meaning "chiseller". The specific epithet punctigula combines the Latin punctum meaning "spot" and gula meaning "throat".

Six subspecies are recognized:

- C. p. ujhelyii (Madarász, 1912)
- C. p. striatigularis (Chapman, 1914)
- C. p. punctipectus (Cabanis & Heine, 1863)
- C. p. zuliae (Cory, 1915)
- C. p. punctigula (Boddaert, 1783)
- C. p. guttatus (von Spix, 1824)

Some further splitting of these subspecies has been proposed but not accepted.

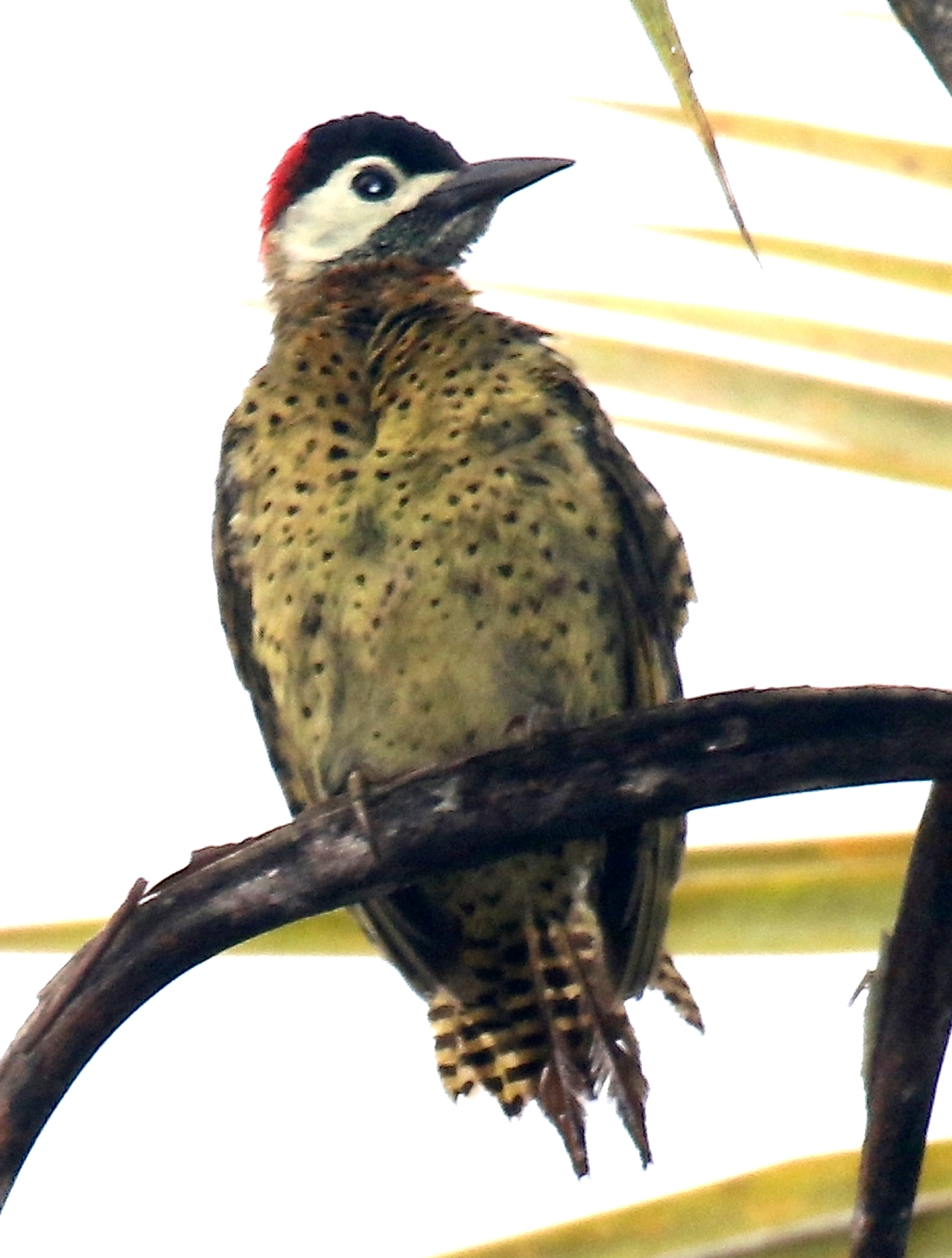
Female C. p. guttatus at Sacha Lodge, Ecuador

== Description ==
The spot-breasted woodpecker is 18 to 21 cm (7.1 to 8.3 in) long and weighs 50 to 79 g (1.8 to 2.8 oz). Males and females have the same plumage except on their heads. Adult males of the nominate subspecies C. p. punctigula have a black forehead and forecrown and a red hindcrown and nape. They are white from their lores around the eye to the nape with a red malar stripe below it. Their chin and throat are black with white spots. Adult females have red only on the very back of the crown. Both sexes have bronze-green upperparts with brownish black bars; their rump and uppertail coverts are paler and less heavily barred. Their flight feathers are brown with pale barring and yellow shafts. Their top side of their tail is brown; the central feathers have weak bars and the outer feathers have green to yellow bars. The tail's underside is yellow-brown with brown bars. Their underparts are dull olive-yellow with a reddish tinge on the upper breast and small black spots there and on the lower breast and flanks. Their undertail coverts are yellowish with black spots. Their short bill is blackish, their iris rufous brown, and the legs greenish gray sometimes with a yellowish tinge. Juveniles are generally duller than adults, have greener upperparts, and have larger spots on their underparts.

Subspecies C. p. striatigularis has a very white throat with a few black streaks, a reddish tinge on the rump and breast, and fairly heavy spotting on the underparts. C. p. ujhelyii also has a very white throat with few streaks, much red to orange on the breast, and much less barring on the upperparts than the nominate. Males often have an entirely red crown. C. p. zuliae is slightly larger than the nominate and is rather dull above with little black on the throat and sparser spots on the breast. C. p. punctipectus is greener above than the nominate without its bronzy tone, has a black throat with large white spots, and is dull below with fewer and smaller spots. C. p. guttatus has large white spots on the throat, is very olive on the breast, and is more heavily spotted below than the nominate.

== Distribution and habitat ==
The subspecies of spot-breasted woodpecker are found thus:

- C. p. ujhelyii, eastern Panama to northern Colombia
- C. p. striatigularis, west-central Colombia
- C. p. punctipectus, eastern Colombia and Venezuela except its northwest
- C. p. zuliae, northwestern Venezuela
- C. p. punctigula, the Guianas and Amapá in northern Brazil
- C. p. guttatus, the Amazon Basin of eastern Ecuador, eastern Peru, northeastern Bolivia, and western to northeastern Brazil

The spot-breasted woodpecker inhabits a wide variety of humid lowland landscapes both open and wooded, though it prefers sparse woodlands to dense ones. It occurs in rainforest, both deciduous and gallery forest, várzea, mangroves, llanos, palm savanna, and palm, shade coffee, and other treed plantations. In elevation it mostly ranges up to 600 m (2,000 ft) Venezuela, to 1,500 m (4,900 ft) in Colombia, to 1,200 m (3,900 ft) but locally to 1,600 m (5,200 ft) in Ecuador, and to 900 m (3,000 ft) in Peru.

== Behavior ==
=== Movement ===
The spot-breasted woodpecker is a year-round resident across its range.

=== Feeding ===
The spot-breasted woodpecker feeds almost entirely on adult ants, their larvae, and their pupae. It usually forages in pairs or family groups, and at any height from the ground to the forest's midlevel. It captures its food mostly by gleaning and probing, and on the ground also sweeps aside litter.

=== Breeding ===
The spot-breasted woodpecker's breeding season varies geographically, being October to May in Colombia, June to August in the Guianas, February to September in Peru, and April to October in much of the Amazon Basin. Both sexes excavate the nest cavity, usually in a living or dead tree but sometimes in a fence post. The clutch size, incubation period, time to fledging, and details of parental care are not known.

=== Vocalization ===
The spot-breasted woodpecker has a large vocal repertoire. It includes "high-pitched weak and nasal 'wha' or 'kah' or 'keeh' in series", a series of "peek" notes in alarm, a "whew" whistle when courting or challenging a rival, a series of "ta-wick" or "week-a" calls in display, a "fast series of 'wick' notes", and "low soft 'pee-ya' calls at intimate meetings" between a pair.

== Status ==
The IUCN has assessed the spot-breasted woodpecker as being of Least Concern. It has a very large range and its estimated population of at least a half million mature individuals is believed to be stable. No immediate threats have been identified. It is considered rare in Panama and fairly common elsewhere. "Adaptable species; its preference for more open woodland means that it does not suffer too much from effects of clearance."
