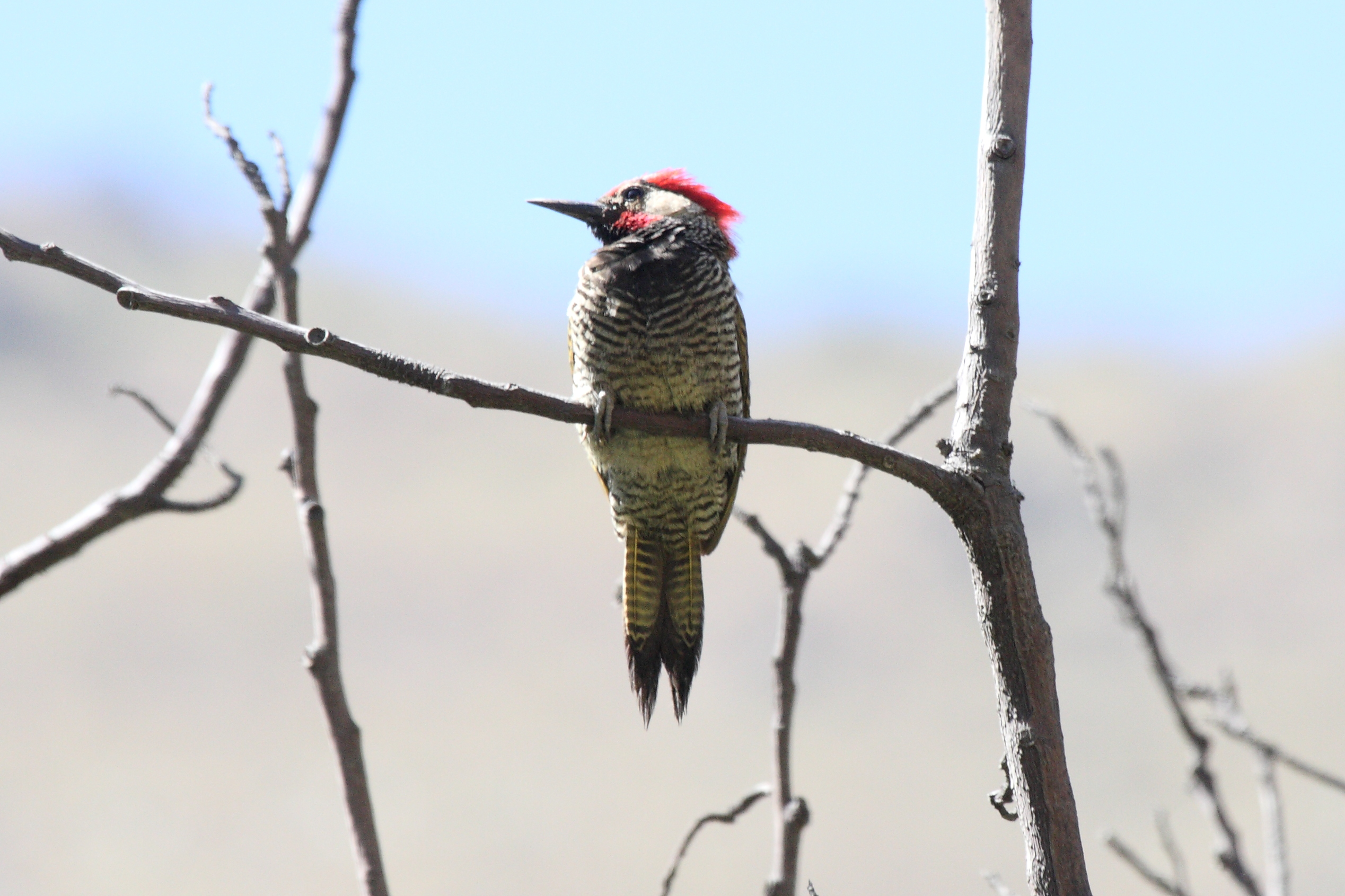

Conservation status
- Least Concern (IUCN 3.1)

Scientific classification
- Kingdom: Animalia
- Phylum: Chordata
- Class: Aves
- Order: Piciformes
- Family: Picidae
- Genus: Colaptes
- Species: C. atricollis

Binomial name
- Colaptes atricollis (Malherbe, 1850)

Synonyms
- Chrysoptilus atricollis

= Black-necked woodpecker =

Species of bird

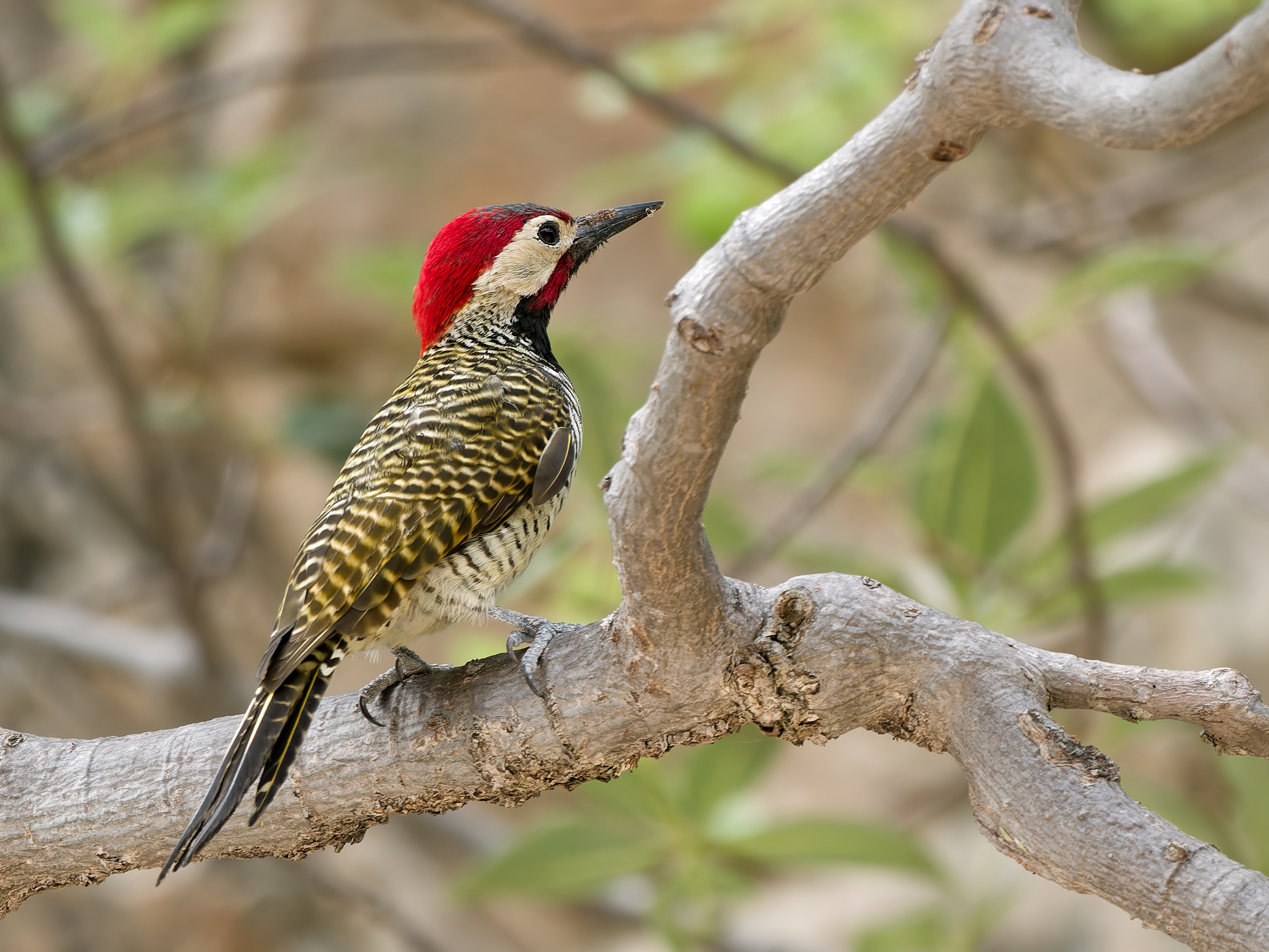
Black-necked Woodpecker endemic in Peru

The black-necked woodpecker or black-necked flicker (Colaptes atricollis) is a species of bird in subfamily Picinae of the woodpecker family Picidae. It is endemic to Peru.

== Taxonomy and systematics ==
The black-necked woodpecker was originally described as Chrysopicos atricollis. It was later placed in genus Chrysoptilus but since about 2007 it has been moved into Colaptes by taxonomic systems.

The black-necked woodpecker has two subspecies, the nominate C. a. atricollis (Malherbe, 1850) and C. a. peruvianus (Reichenbach, 1854).

== Description ==
The black-necked woodpecker is 26 to 27 cm (10 to 11 in) long and weighs 73 to 90 g (2.6 to 3.2 oz). Males and females have the same plumage except on their heads. Adult males of the nominate subspecies are dark gray from forehead to forecrown and red on the hindcrown and upper nape; the gray often has red feather tips. They are yellowish white from their lores around the eye to the nape with a red malar stripe below it and a black chin and throat. Adult females have red only on the hindcrown and their malar is blackish. Both sexes have bronze-green upperparts with narrow blackish bars; both colors are paler on their rump and uppertail coverts. Their flight feathers are dark brown with yellowish barring and olive-yellow shafts. Their tail is dark brown; the central feathers and the outer web of the outermost pair have paler barring. Their breast is black and the rest of their underparts are pale yellow with black bars. Their longish bill is black with a paler base, their iris brown to chestnut-brown, and the legs green-gray. Juveniles are generally duller than adults and have a darker face; the top of their head is often red with dark bars, their malar mixed black and red, and the upper- and underparts' barring is more diffuse. Subspecies C. a. peruvianus is smaller than the nominate with a shorter bill. Its upperparts are paler but more heavily barred and its underparts are both paler and less barred.

== Distribution and habitat ==
The nominate subspecies of black-necked woodpecker is found on the west slope of the Peruvian Andes between the departments of La Libertad and Tacna. Subspecies C. a. peruvianus is found on the east slope of Peru's Andes from the valley of the Marañón River south into Huánuco Department. The species inhabits a variety of semi-arid to arid landscapes including drier cloudforest, montane scrublands with cacti, desert scrublands, and deciduous woodlands. It also occurs in riparian woodlands, orchards, plantations, and gardens. On the western slope it is mostly found at elevations between 500 and 2,800 m (1,600 and 9,200 ft) but occurs locally as high as 4,000 m (13,100 ft). In the Marañón Valley it is found between 1,700 and 4,300 m (5,600 and 14,100 ft).

== Behavior ==
=== Movement ===
The black-necked woodpecker is mostly a year-round resident across its range though some seasonal elevational movements are suspected.

=== Feeding ===
The black-necked woodpecker feeds almost entirely on adult ants, their larvae, and their pupae. It usually forages singly or in pairs, and at any level from the ground to the treetops. It captures its food mostly by gleaning and probing.

=== Breeding ===
The black-necked woodpecker's breeding season is not well defined but appears to center around June and July. Nest holes have been documented in trees, cacti, utility poles, and a dry river bank. The clutch size is two to four eggs. The incubation period is 14 days and fledging occurs about 28 days after hatch. Both adults incubate the eggs and provision the nestlings.

=== Vocalization ===
The black-necked woodpecker makes a "loud clear 'wic' in [a] long series". Its alarm calls include "peah" and "chypp".

== Status ==
The IUCN has assessed the black-necked woodpecker as being of Least Concern. It has a large range, and though its population size is not known it is believed to be stable. No immediate threats have been identified. It is "[u]ncommon generally; locally somewhat more common."
