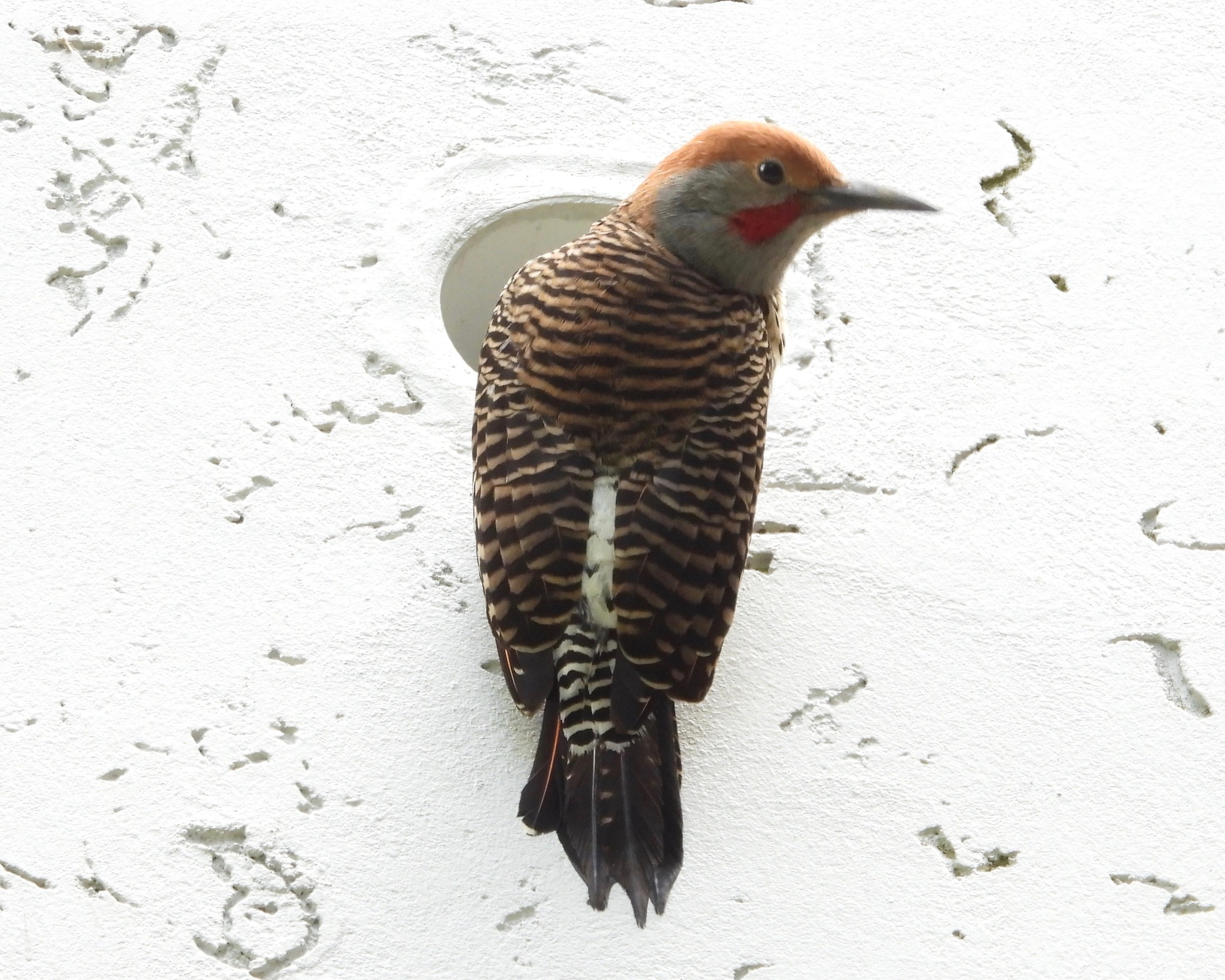

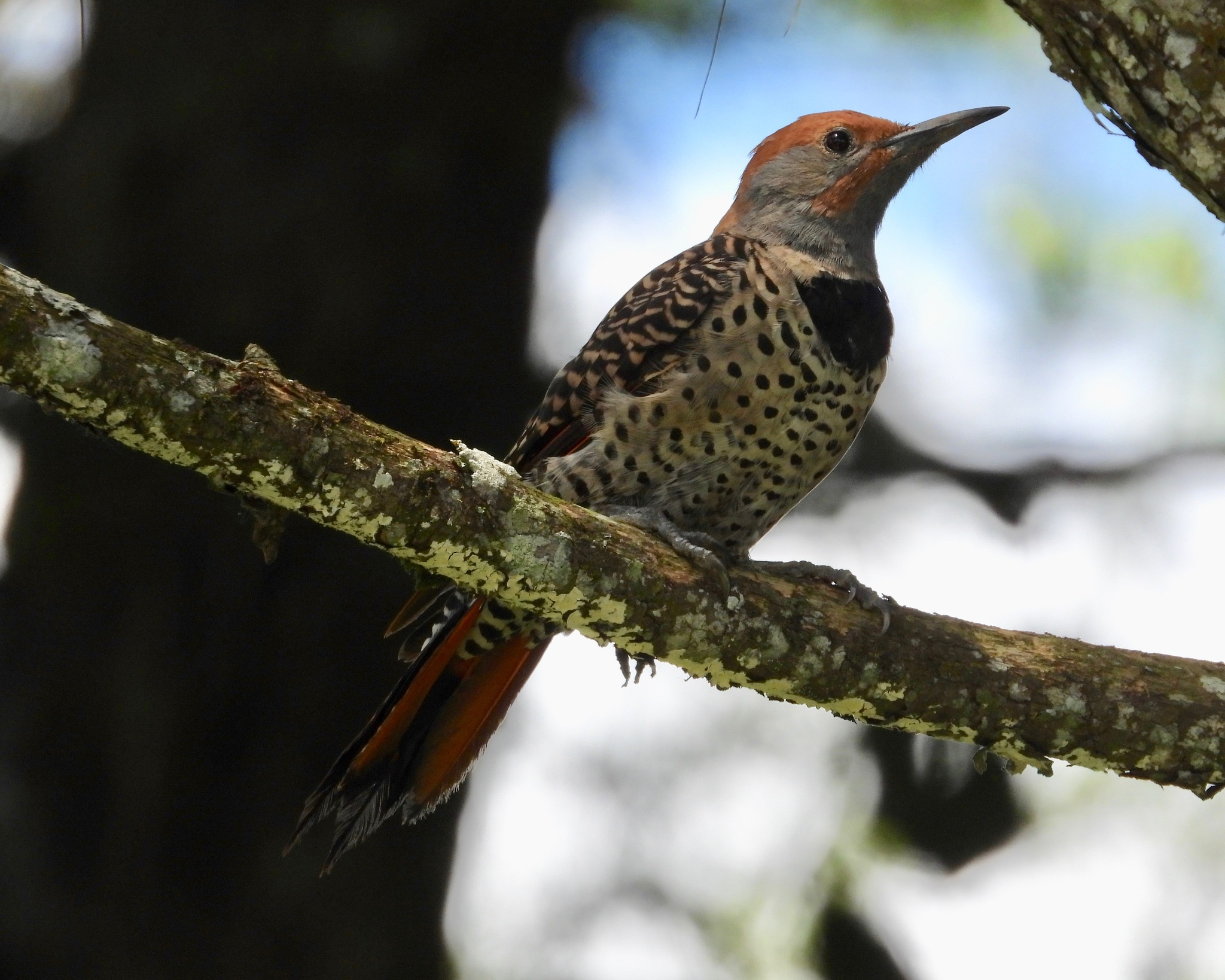
- Male (above) and female (below)

Conservation status
- Least Concern (IUCN 3.1)

Scientific classification
- Kingdom: Animalia
- Phylum: Chordata
- Class: Aves
- Order: Piciformes
- Family: Picidae
- Genus: Colaptes
- Species: C. mexicanoides

Binomial name
- Colaptes mexicanoides Lafresnaye, 1844

= Guatemalan flicker =

Species of bird

The Guatemalan flicker (Colaptes mexicanoides) is a species of bird in the family Picidae, the woodpeckers. It is found in Middle America from southern Mexico to Nicaragua.

== Taxonomy and systematics ==
The Guatemalan flicker was described in 1844 by Frédéric de Lafresnaye under the name Colaptes mexicanoides. During the 1940s to 1960s several authors treated it as a subspecies of what was then Colaptes cafer. That subspecies, mexicanoides, and some other subspecies of flicker were later classified as subspecies of the widespread northern flicker (C. auratus). BirdLife International's Handbook of the Birds of the World reclassified it as a separate species in 2014 based on plumage differences. In 2024 David Tønnessen synthesized the results of several studies and proposed that the North American Classification Committee of the American Ornithological Society recognize the species. The AOS, the International Ornithological Congress, and the Clements taxonomy all recognized it as a species in 2024.

The Guatemalan flicker is monotypic.

== Description ==
The Guatemalan flicker is 25.9 to 32.9 cm (10 to 13 in) long and weighs about 115 to 135 g (4.1 to 4.8 oz). The sexes have almost the same plumage, differing only on the face. Females have a cinnamon "mustache" and males a bright red one. Adults of both sexes have a cinnamon rufous to rufous-chestnut crown and nape on an otherwise gray face, throat, and neck. Their back has wide black and light brown bars. Their rump and uppertail coverts are white with some black spots on the former and black bars on the latter. The upper side of their tail is black and the underside rufous orange with wide black tips on the feathers. Their scapulars, wing coverts, and secondaries are barred with black and light brown. The top side of their rectrices are black with orange or red shafts and the bottoms orange- or salmon-pink. They have a black crescent on the upper breast. The rest of their underparts are dull white in the middle becoming pale pinkish gray on the sides, with a roundish black spot on the tip of each feather. They have a dark reddish brown iris, a dull brownish black to slaty black bill, and bluish to gray legs and feet.

== Distribution and habitat ==
The Guatemalan flicker is found the highlands from Chiapas in Mexico south through Guatemala and Honduras into Nicaragua as far as the Matagalpa Department. It also occurs locally in eastern El Salvador. It inhabits a wide variety of forest types in the subtropical and temperate zones including pine, pine-oak, and broadleaf deciduous. It also occurs in cloudforest and scrublands, plantations, and gardens near forest. In elevation it ranges between 750 and 4,000 m (2,500 and 13,100 ft).

== Behavior ==
=== Movement ===
The Guatemalan flicker is probably a year-round resident, though some elevational movement is suspected.

=== Feeding ===
The Guatemalan flicker feeds primarily on insects and also includes fruits and seeds in its diet, though details are lacking. It forages mostly on the ground, probing and hammering into soil to capture prey. It also takes insects from tree bark and takes fruit and seeds from trees and on the ground. It uses its sticky barbed tongue to feed. It often forages by itself, but also does so with others of its species and sometimes especially on the ground in loose association with other bird species.

=== Breeding ===
The Guatemalan flicker's breeding season has not been fully defined, but spans at least from late January to May. The species excavates a cavity in diseased or dead trees and branches; both sexes contribute, but the male apparently does most of the work. It sometimes re-uses an existing cavity. The clutch size, incubation period, and time to fledging are not known. Both sexes incubate the eggs and care for the nestlings, but their relative contributions are not known.

=== Vocal and non-vocal sounds ===
The Guatemalan flicker is highly vocal and has several calls. Its "long call" is a "raptorlike keh-keh-keh-keh-keh-keh...". It also makes a "wik'a-wik'a-wik'a-wik'a" call. It also makes a "puh" call, "a series of short, single notes that superficially resemble a single note of the Long Call" and occasionally a "gurgling almost involuntary chur-r-r-r-r". Its drum is "a series of soft taps that lasts about 1 second".

== Status ==
The IUCN has assessed the Guatemalan flicker as being of Least Concern. It has a large range; its population size is not known but is believed to be decreasing. No immediate threats have been identified. It is considered fairly common in northern Central America. It occurs in several protected areas. According to Juárez et al., "the Guatemalan Flicker favors open landscapes and relatively open forest structures, so disturbances such as fire, logging, or insect outbreaks that open up the forest floor and increase the abundance of standing dead wood may be positively associated with local population increases." The IUCN regards the species as having a medium dependence on forest in the context of locally declining tree cover.
