= Flicker (surname) =

Flicker is a surname. Notable people with this surname include:

- Mike Flicker (born 1950), American music producer
- Peter Flicker (born 1964), Austrian football manager and former player
- Siggy Flicker (born 1967), Israeli-American television personality and writer
- Tal Flicker (born 1992), Israeli judoka
- Theodore J. Flicker (1930–2014), American playwright
- Yuval Flicker (born 1955), Israeli-born American mathematician

== See also ==
- Flicker, the original bass guitarist for the band Manic Street Preachers
- Flicker (disambiguation)
