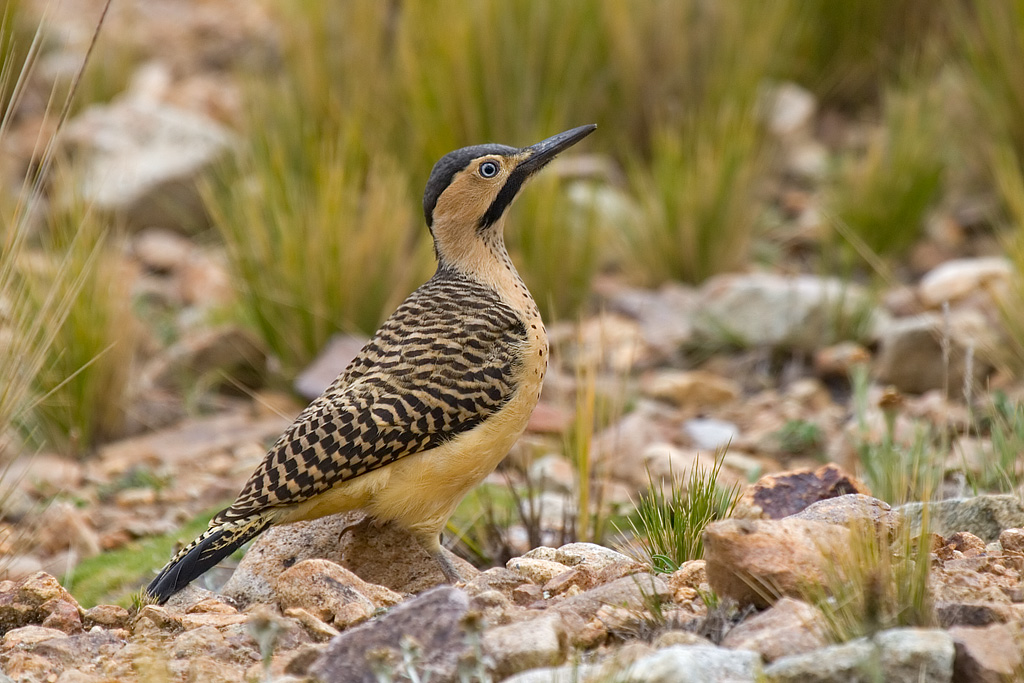

Conservation status
- Least Concern (IUCN 3.1)

- Least Concern (IUCN 3.1)

Scientific classification
- Kingdom: Animalia
- Phylum: Chordata
- Class: Aves
- Order: Piciformes
- Family: Picidae
- Genus: Colaptes
- Species: C. rupicola

Binomial name
- Colaptes rupicola D'Orbigny, 1840
- Range of "southern" Andean flicker

= Andean flicker =

Species of woodpecker

The Andean flicker (Colaptes rupicola) is a species of bird in subfamily Picinae of the woodpecker family Picidae. It is found in Argentina, Bolivia, Chile, Ecuador, and Peru.

== Taxonomy and systematics ==
The Andean flicker was for a time placed in genus Soroplex that was later merged into Colaptes. It and the Chilean flicker (C. pitius) are sister species.

The American Ornithological Society, the International Ornithological Committee, and the Clements taxonomy assign three subspecies to the Andean flicker: the nominate C. r. rupicola (D'Orbigny, 1840), C. r. cinereicapillus (Reichenbach, 1854), and C. r. puna (Cabanis, 1883).

Both C. r. cinereicapillus and C. r. puna have at one time been treated as separate species. BirdLife International's Handbook of the Birds of the World includes puna with the nominate as the "southern Andean flicker" and treats cinereicapillus as the separate species "northern Andean flicker".

This article follows the three-subspecies model.

== Description ==
The Andean flicker is about 32 cm (13 in) long. Males and females have the same plumage except on their heads. Adult males of the nominate subspecies are dark slate gray from forehead to hindneck; the last occasionally has a hint of red. Their face, chin, and throat are pale buffy white with a thin black malar stripe with red tips on the feathers. Adult females have an all-black malar stripe and never any red on the hindneck. Both sexes' upperparts are barred with brown, light brown, and buffy white; their uppertail coverts are white with narrow dark bars. Their flight feathers are dark brown with narrow pale buff bars. The top side of their tail is black; the central and outermost feathers have thin paler bars. Their tail's underside is dark brown with sometimes yellowish on the outer edge. Their underparts are whitish with a variable orange-buff wash on the breast and small blackish marks there and sometimes on the flanks. Their long bill is black, their iris lemon yellow, and the legs yellowish gray, greenish, or grayish pink. Juveniles are duller than adults but with pale blue or reddish brown eyes, and they have buff tips on the rear crown feathers and bar-like rather than spotted underparts. Males usually have some red on their nape.

Subspecies C. r. puna is similar to the nominate but is darker both above and below. The markings on its breast are larger, the tail usually less barred, and the legs dull greenish. The female's malar stripe often is indistinct and both sexes have a dark red patch on their hindneck. Subspecies C. r. cinereicapillus is significantly different from the nominate. Its face, throat, and breast are rich tan-buff, the belly and rump yellow-buff, and the breast has black bars rather than spots. It has no red on its nape and the red tips on its malar feathers are only on the back few rather than on all of them.

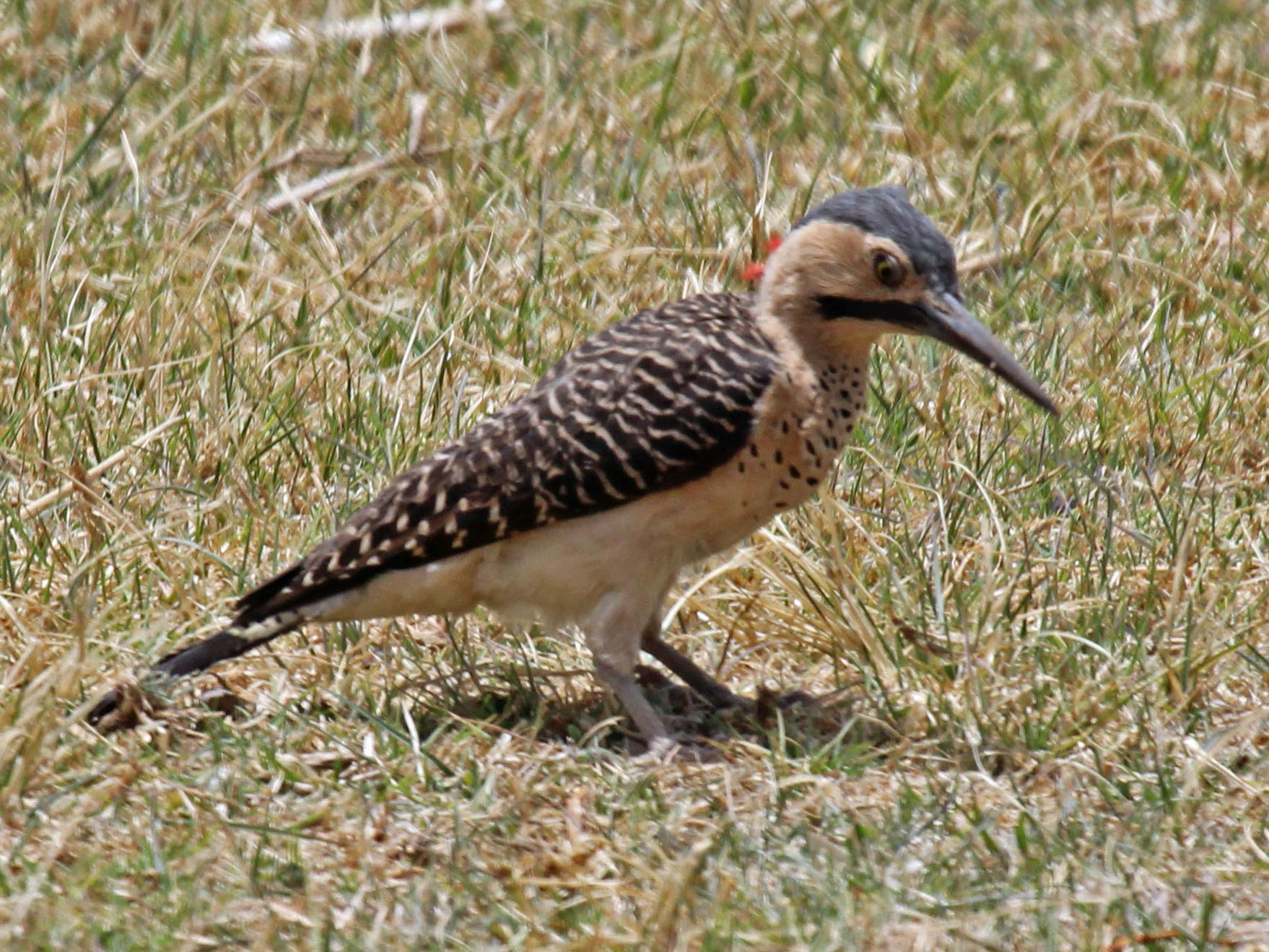
Andean flicker C. r. puna

== Distribution and habitat ==
Subspecies C. r. cinereicapillus the Andean flicker is the northernmost. It is found from Loja Province in extreme southern Ecuador south into central Peru as far as the departments of Pasco and Junín. C. r. puna is found in central and southern Peru. The nominate C. r. rupicola is found from northern Chile's Tarapacá Region through western, southern, and central Bolivia into northwestern Argentina as far as Catamarca Province.

The Andean flicker is a bird of open country. It inhabits the páramo, the puna, Polylepis woodland, montane scrublands, and other landscapes of mixed rock, grass, and some higher vegetation. It uses rocks, cliffs, and trees as lookout points. In elevation it ranges between 2,000 and 5,000 m (6,600 and 16,400 ft) but usually is above 3,000 m (9,800 ft). The few reports below that elevation are thought to be non-breeding adults roaming to forage.

== Behavior ==
=== Movement ===
The Andean flicker is mostly a year-round resident throughout its range but is believed to move from the highest elevations if forced by snow or cold.

=== Feeding ===
The Andean flicker is almost entirely terrestrial in its foraging. Single birds, pairs and gregarious groups of up to about 10 birds move across the landscape. (A group of 21 was once documented.) It typically drops from a vantage point to probe, dig, and sweep away pebbles and debris in search of prey and then returns to the elevated perch. Its diet is insects including beetles both adult and larval, and other large larvae such as those of butterflies. Other adult insects are also taken.

=== Breeding ===
The Andean flicker's breeding biology is unusual for a woodpecker. It nests colonially, with 10 or more pairs very close together. It excavates a nest cavity in an earthen bank or in soil on a rock face. Its nesting season is believed to be September to November in central Peru and January to March in some other areas. "[C]old and snowfall in wet season [are] of great influence in determining timing of nesting." Both parents provision chicks. The clutch size, incubation period, time to fledging, and other details of parental care are not known.

=== Vocalization ===
The Andean flicker has a large vocal repertoire. Its most common calls are "a loud, piercing kweeir...and a loud tew-tew-tew". Males display with a "kwa-kwa-kwa, wee-a, wee-a or kway-áp call". They also make "single or grouped peek or kek" calls that are thought to be for contact or alarm, and "a clear descending trill, brrrridip" that is thought to be for long-distance communication.

== Status ==
The IUCN follows HBW taxonomy and so has assessed the "northern" and "southern" Andean flickers separately. Both are considered to be of Least Concern. Both have large ranges and unknown population sizes that are believed to be stable. No immediate threats to either have been identified. The species is considered uncommon to locally fairly common, except uncommon and local in Ecuador where it was first documented in the 1990s. It occurs in several national parks and sanctuaries.
