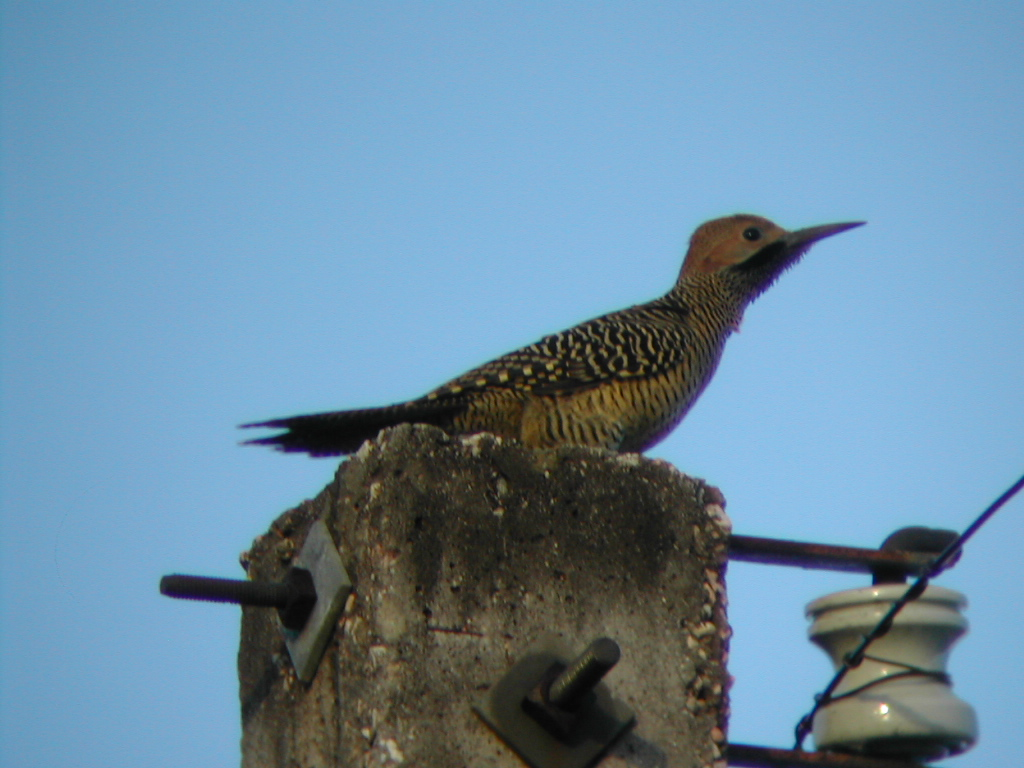

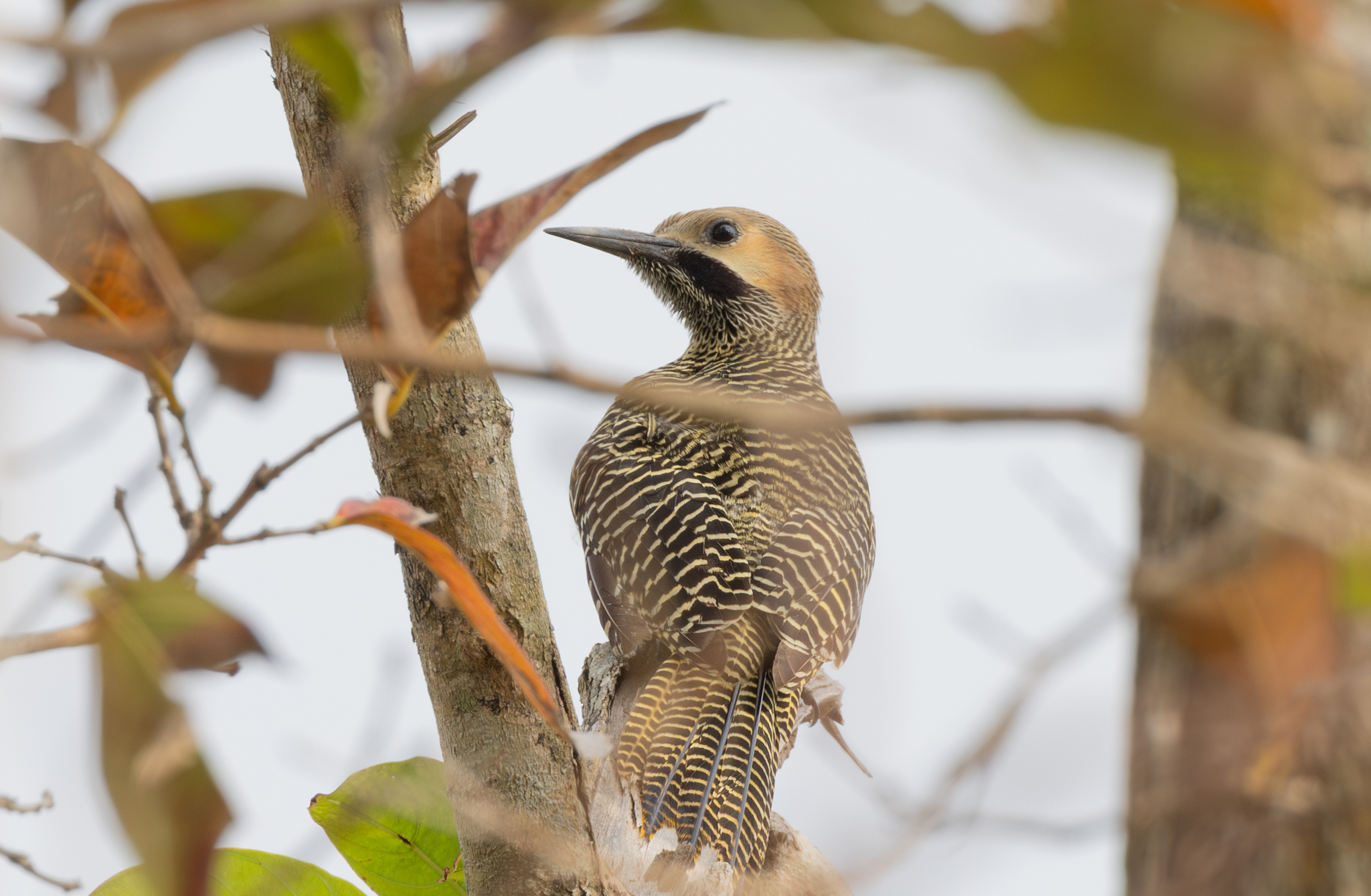
- Bermejas, Cuba La Tumba, Artesima, Cuba

Conservation status
- Endangered (IUCN 3.1)

Scientific classification
- Kingdom: Animalia
- Phylum: Chordata
- Class: Aves
- Order: Piciformes
- Family: Picidae
- Genus: Colaptes
- Species: C. fernandinae

Binomial name
- Colaptes fernandinae Vigors, 1827

Synonyms
- Nesoceleus fernandinae

= Fernandina's flicker =

Species of bird

Fernandina's flicker (Colaptes fernandinae), also known as the Cuban flicker, is a species of bird in the woodpecker family, Picidae. Endemic to Cuba, it is severely threatened by habitat loss and is one of the most endangered species of woodpecker in the world.

== Taxonomy ==
The species was originally described by Irish zoologist Nicholas Aylward Vigors in 1827, based on a holotype specimen collected from near Havana. The specific epithet, fernandinae, references José María Herrera y Herrera, Second Conde de Fernandina, a wealthy Cuban noble who operated several sugar cane plantations. In 1873, based primarily on a lack of feather covering over the nostrils, a streaked crown, and a completely barred tail whch lacks any solidly black area, it was reassigned by English zoologist Philip Sclater and English naturalist Osbert Salvin to a newly erected monotypic genus, Nesoceleus. In 1965, it was placed back in genus Colaptes by American ornithologist Lester L. Short due to lacking sufficiently divergent traits to warrant status as a monotypic genus.

It is the most basal species within Colaptes. Fernandina's flicker likely originated from North American flicker ancestors, which date to the early Pliocene in North America; there is currently no known evidence indicating that flickers occupied the West Indies outside of Cuba and Grand Cayman.

== Description ==
Fernandina's flicker is a medium-sized woodpecker, ranging in length from 14–15 in (36–38 cm). Birds of central Cuba are generally somewhat smaller than those from eastern and western Cuba. On males, the crown and nape are buffy cinnamon, with fine black streaking and occasional tinges of red. The ear-coverts are a buffish-yellow to cinnamon. The chin and throat are off-white with heavy black streaking; males have a distinctive black malar stripe, while in females the black malar is instead heavily streaked with white. The upperparts are pale yellow to yellowish-tan, with dense blackish-brown to black barring, while the underparts are pale yellowish-buff with dark brown barring that is paler and weaker on the belly. The undertail is yellow, while the rump and uppertail coverts are paler, with narrower barring. Its underwings are yellow, and the distinctive yellow coloration is visible in flight. Juveniles are duller and browner, with broader markings on the underside and less distinctive barring above.

== Distribution and habitat ==
Fernandina's flicker is endemic to Cuba, where it occurs primarily in lowland open-palm savannah and dry savanna, dry forests, pastures, swampy forest, forest edges, and sometimes in dense woodlands. It is closely associated with palm trees, particularly the Sabal palmetto (Saval parviflora) and the royal palm (Roystonea regia). Though it was apparently never common, it was formerly found across the island. Now, however, it is restricted to isolated locations in nine of the country's 15 provinces: Camagüey, Cienfuegos, Granma, Holguín, Las Tunas, Matanzas, Pinar del Río, Santiago de Cuba, and Villa Clara. The largest population is found in Zapata Swamp, where some 120 pairs are estimated to live, though this number may have dropped following recent hurricanes.

== Behavior ==
Though not a particularly social bird, populations of Fernandina's flicker in the Zapata Swamp have been observed forming loose colonies. It regularly fights with other woodpeckers.

=== Feeding ===
Like other flickers, Fernandina's flicker often forages on the ground; it primarily feeds on ants, but will also pursue other insects, worms, grubs, and seeds. It uses its strong bill to probe the ground and flick aside leaf litter. In addition to ground foraging, it also feeds on ants & termites found in both live and dead palms, particularly during the wet season when the ground is flooded.

=== Breeding ===
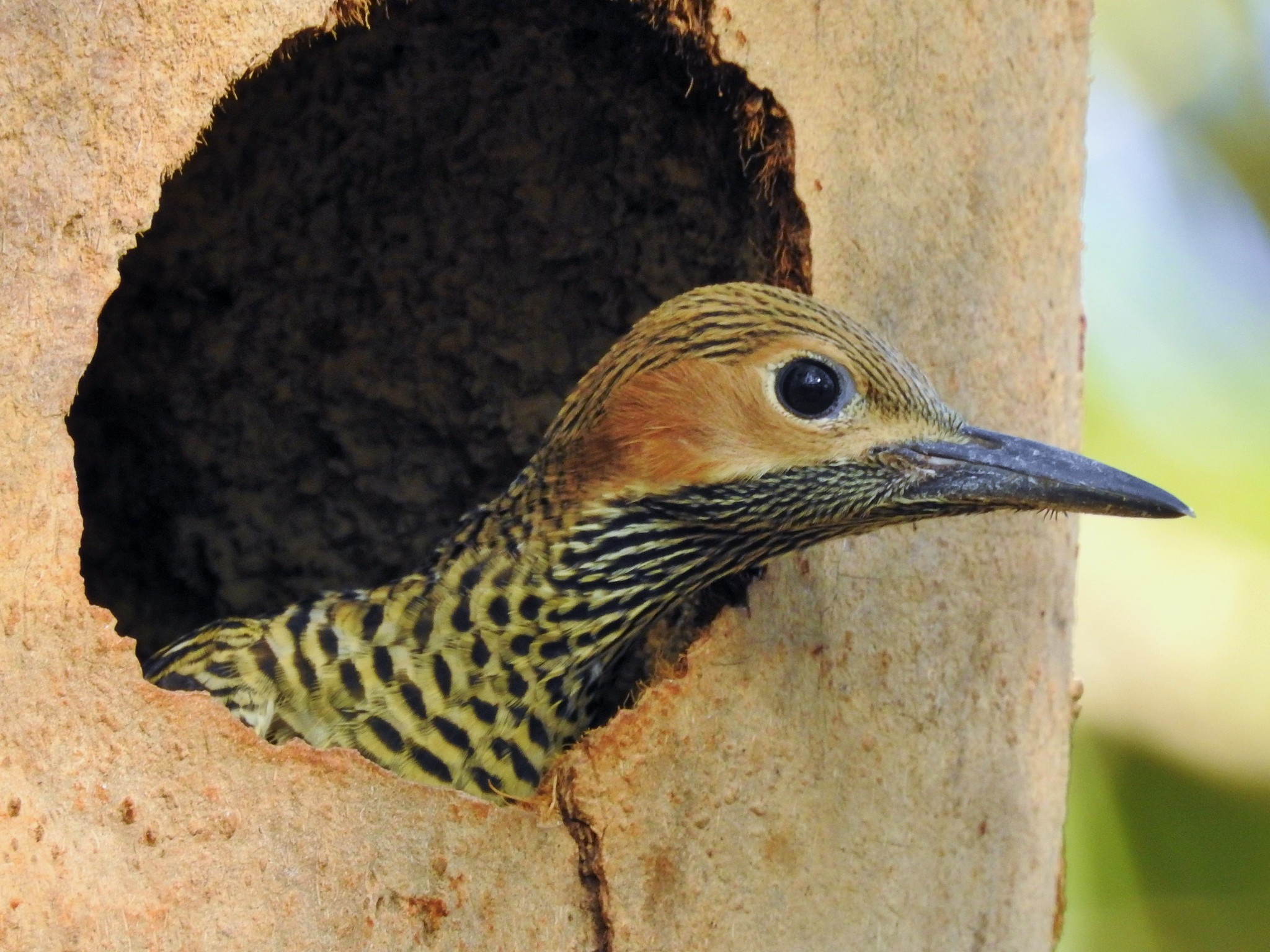
A female Fernandina's flicker poking her head out of a nesting cavity.

Fernandina's flicker breeds between March and June. From late December through January courtship takes place, during which pairs regularly engage in high-flying chases. Nest excavation begins in February or March. Like all woodpeckers, it is a cavity nester, and nests primarily in palms of genuses Copernicia, Sabal, and Roystonea. It is also known to nest in other palms such as juçara (Euterpe edulis) and wild tamarind (Lysiloma latisiliquum). Fernandina's flicker prefers to use nest holes started by West Indian woodpeckers (Melanerpes superciliaris); the flicker drives off the original owners, finishes off the excavation work, and moves in.

Nests are about 4.37 m (14.3 ft) from the ground, with the entrance being 9.1 cm (3.6 in) across; the nest chamber is .59 m (1.9 ft) deep and 29.4 cm (11.6 in) in diameter.

The female lays a clutch of three to five white eggs, which are incubated for a period of about 18 days. The young fledge after 22 days. West Indian woodpeckers, which are highly territorial, have been observed destroying and preying on eggs and chicks of Fernandina's flicker.

Although it is predominantly a solitary breeder, with aggression between individuals and pairs common, the formation of loose colonies of up to about 15 birds during breeding season has been observed at Bermejas in the Zapata Swamp. It is possible that the environmental conditions of this area - access to water in the dry season, soft ground, and low secondary growth - are a requirement for colonial breeding, with sufficient resources encouraging the birds to nest closer together.

=== Voice ===
It is not especially noisy outside of the breeding season. The Fernandina's flicker's calls include a repeated wicka (the onomatopoeic sound which gives the genus its common name), a loud pic-pic-pic-pic-pic-pic, which is slower lower-pitched than the similar calls of the northern flicker (Colaptes auratus), and a nasal ch-ch-ch during breeding.

== Conservation ==
It is listed as Endangered on the IUCN Red List. Fernandina's flicker is one of the most endangered woodpecker species in the world, with population estimates varying from a maximum total of 300-400 to estimates of 600-800 birds, which occur in small, scattered subpopulations. The population is declining, principally because of ongoing habitat loss. Introduced mammals also pose a threat. Estimating the total population or number of breeding pairs is difficult, as the birds tend to be sparsely and seemingly randomly distributed throughout suitable habitat.

Fernandina's flicker is highly dependent on standing dead palm trees for nesting sites; nests have not been reliably recorded without the presence of dead palms. The continued loss of suitable nesting trees due to land clearance for agriculture, logging, saltwater incursion from sea level rise, and hurricanes (which often fell dead palm trees) is resulting in further population decline and intensifying competition with other cavity-nesting birds, including the West Indian woodpecker, northern flicker, and the Cuban Green woodpecker (Xiphidiopicus percussus).

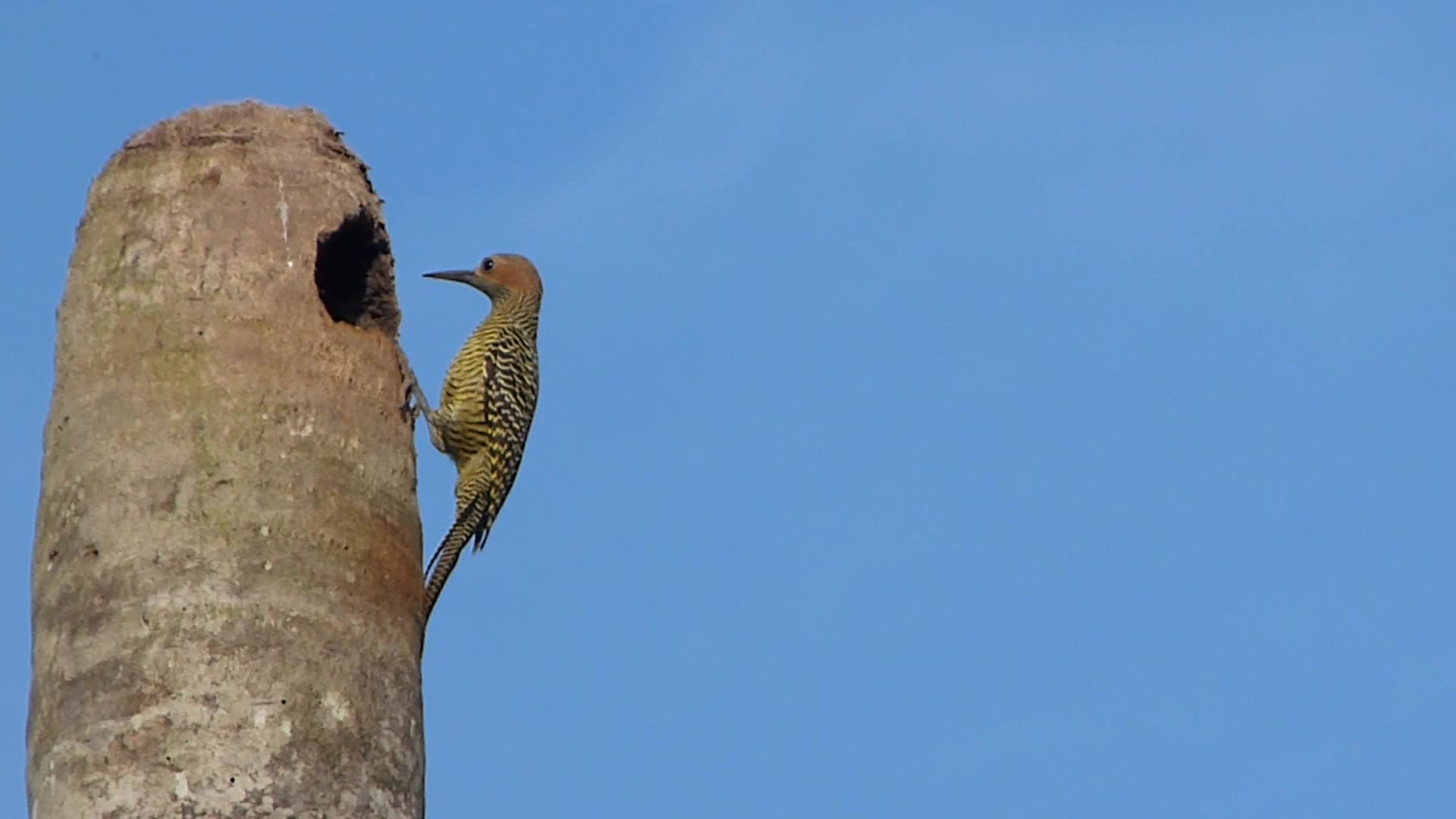
A Fernandina's flicker perched at the entrance to its nest in a standing dead palm tree, in Playa Larga.

Fernandina's flicker often shares nesting sites with Cuban amazons (Amazona leucocephala leucocephala) and is impacted by trappers, who will bring down whole palm trees in order to capture nestling parrots for the caged bird trade or to eat the woodpecker's eggs and nestlings. The felling of these dead palms is a severe threat to the long-term survival of the Fernandina's flicker, as it represents not just a loss of any nestlings or clutches of eggs currently in the tree, but also the permanent loss of that tree as a nesting site.

[[

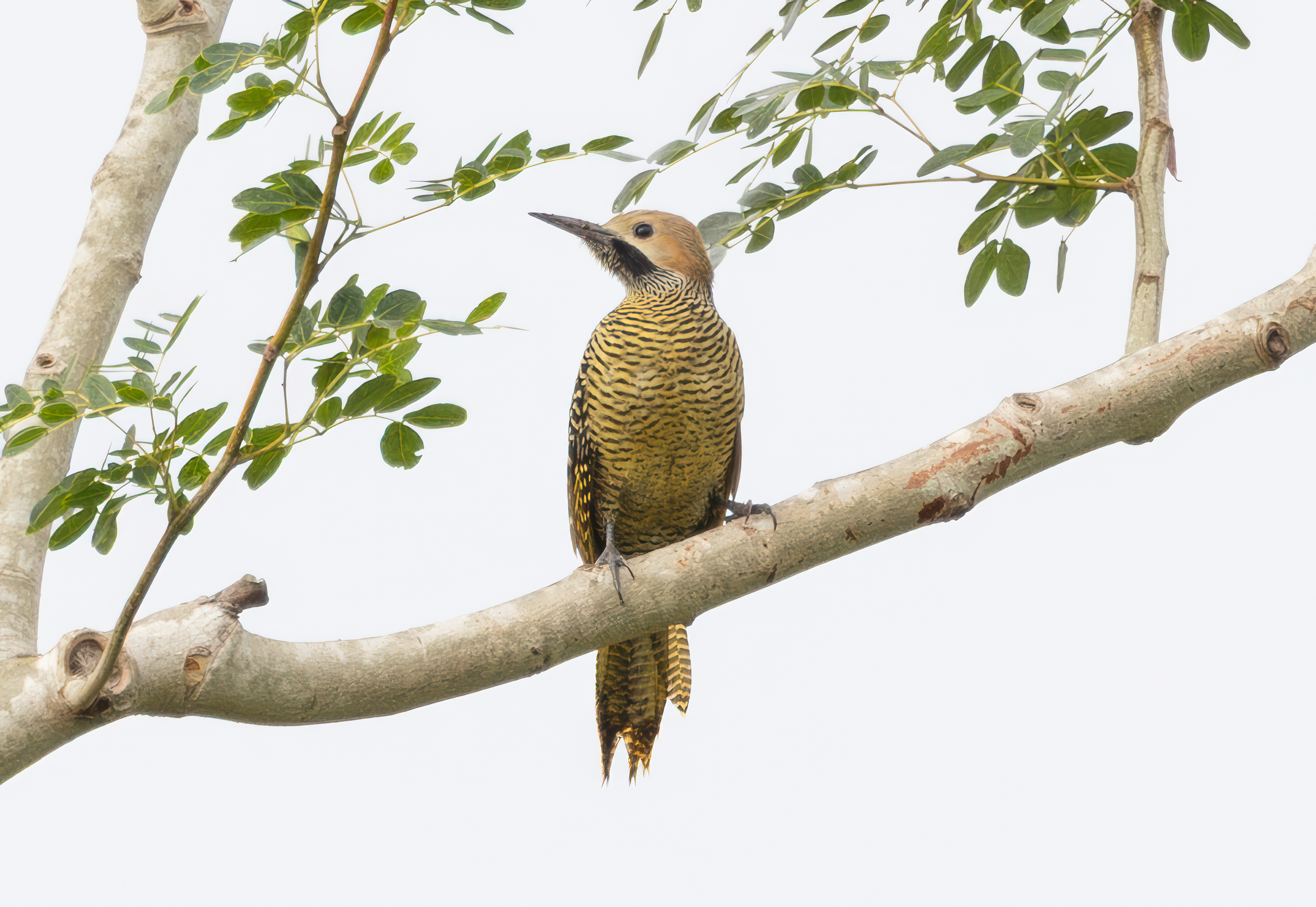
La Tumba, Artesima, Cuba

|thumb]]
