= USS Flicker =

USS Flicker is a name the U.S. Navy has assigned to more than one ship:

- USS Flicker (AM-70), built in 1937 by Bath Iron Works, Bath, Maine
- USS Flicker (AMS-9) was so named and reclassified from YMS-219 on 17 February 1947
- USS Flicker (AM-416), was planned but contracts for construction were canceled on 12 August 1945
