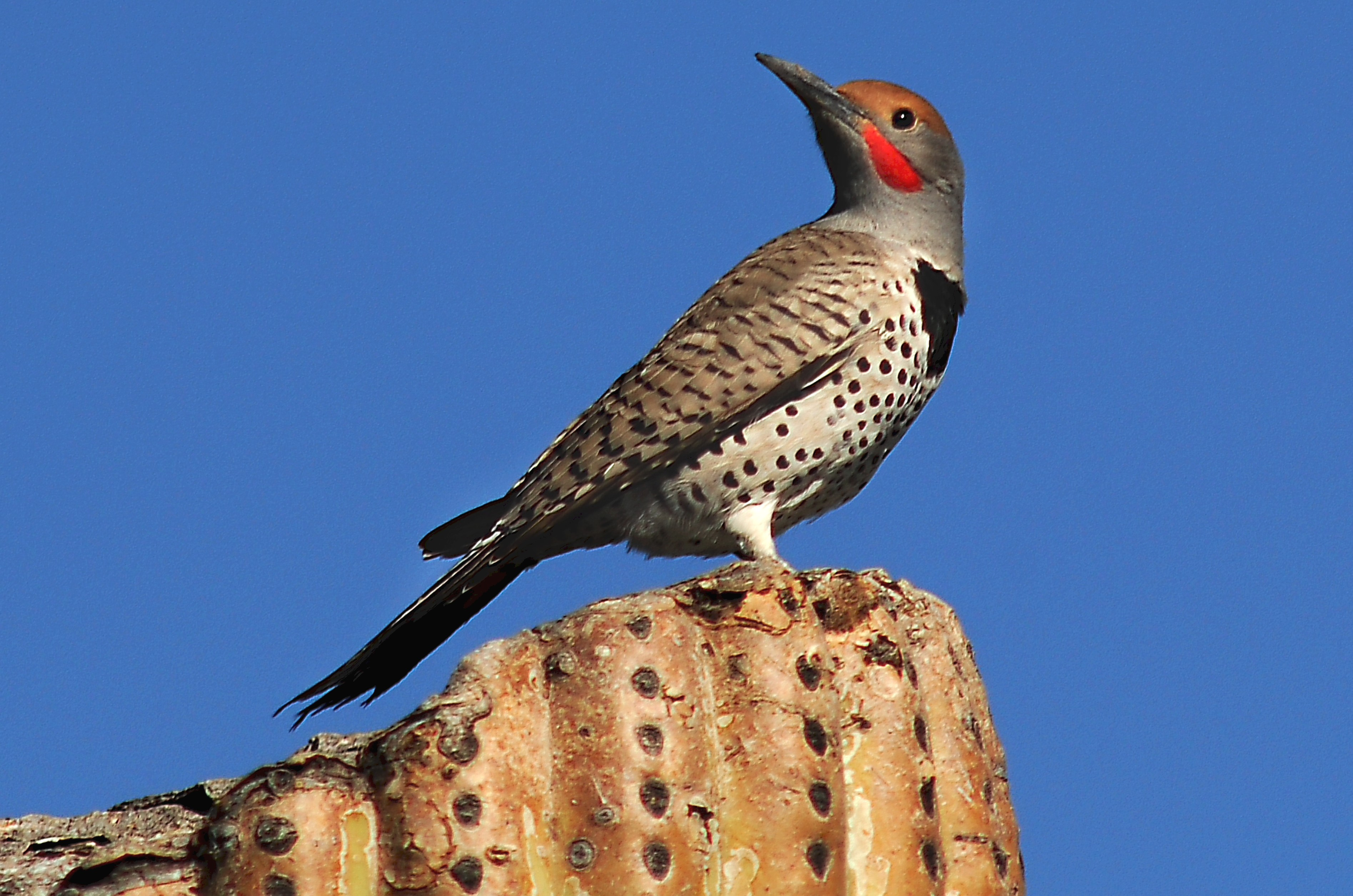
- Gilded flicker (Colaptes chrysoides)

Scientific classification
- Kingdom: Animalia
- Phylum: Chordata
- Class: Aves
- Order: Piciformes
- Family: Picidae
- Tribe: Picini
- Genus: Colaptes; Vigors, 1825

Type species
- Cuculus auratus Linnaeus, 1758

Species
- see text

Synonyms
- Chrysoptilus; Nesoceleus

= Colaptes =

Genus of birds

Colaptes is a genus of birds in the woodpecker family Picidae. The 13 extant species are found across the Americas.

Colaptes woodpeckers typically have a brown or green back and wings with black barring, and a beige to yellowish underside, with black spotting or barring. There are usually colorful markings on the head. Many of these birds – particularly the northern species – are more terrestrial than usual among woodpeckers.

Historically, there has been considerable uncertainty in assigning woodpecker species to genera and it is only by comparing DNA sequences that it has become possible to confidently place many of the species.

== Taxonomy ==
The genus Colaptes was introduced by the Irish zoologist Nicholas Aylward Vigors in 1825 with the northern flicker (Colaptes auratus) as the type species. The genus name is from Ancient Greek κολάπτης (koláptēs), meaning 'chiseller, pecker'.

The genus forms part of the woodpecker subfamily Picinae and has a sister relationship to the genus Piculus. The genus Colaptes is a member of the tribe Picini and belongs to a clade that contains five genera: Colaptes, Piculus, Mulleripicus, Dryocopus and Celeus. Some of the relationships between the species within Colaptes are uncertain, with various genetic studies reporting slightly different phylogenies, but it is evident that those species with "flicker" in their common name do not form a monophyletic group.

The genus Colaptes contains 14 species. Of these, one, the Bermuda flicker, is now extinct:

Image	Common name	Scientific name	Distribution
	Golden-olive woodpecker	Colaptes rubiginosus	east to Guyana, northwestern Argentina, and Trinidad and Tobago
	Grey-crowned woodpecker	Colaptes auricularis	Mexico
	Crimson-mantled woodpecker	Colaptes rivolii	Bolivia, Colombia, Ecuador, Peru and Venezuela
	Black-necked woodpecker	Colaptes atricollis	Peru
	Spot-breasted woodpecker	Colaptes punctigula	Bolivia, Brazil, Colombia, Ecuador, French Guiana, Peru, Suriname and Venezuela; also in eastern Panama
	Green-barred woodpecker	Colaptes melanochloros	Argentina, Bolivia, Brazil, Paraguay and Uruguay
	Northern flicker	Colaptes auratus	North America, Cuba and Grand Cayman in the Cayman Islands
	Gilded flicker	Colaptes chrysoides	the Southwestern United States and northwestern Mexico
	Guatemalan flicker	Colaptes mexicanoides	southern Mexico to Nicaragua
	Fernandina's flicker	Colaptes fernandinae	Cuba
	Chilean flicker	Colaptes pitius	Argentina and Chile
	Andean flicker	Colaptes rupicola	Peru, Chile, eastern Bolivia and northeastern Argentina
	Campo flicker	Colaptes campestris	Brazil, Bolivia, Paraguay, Uruguay and northeastern Argentina, Suriname

- † Bermuda flicker (Colaptes oceanicus) - extinct, but may have survived into historical times - formerly Bermuda
