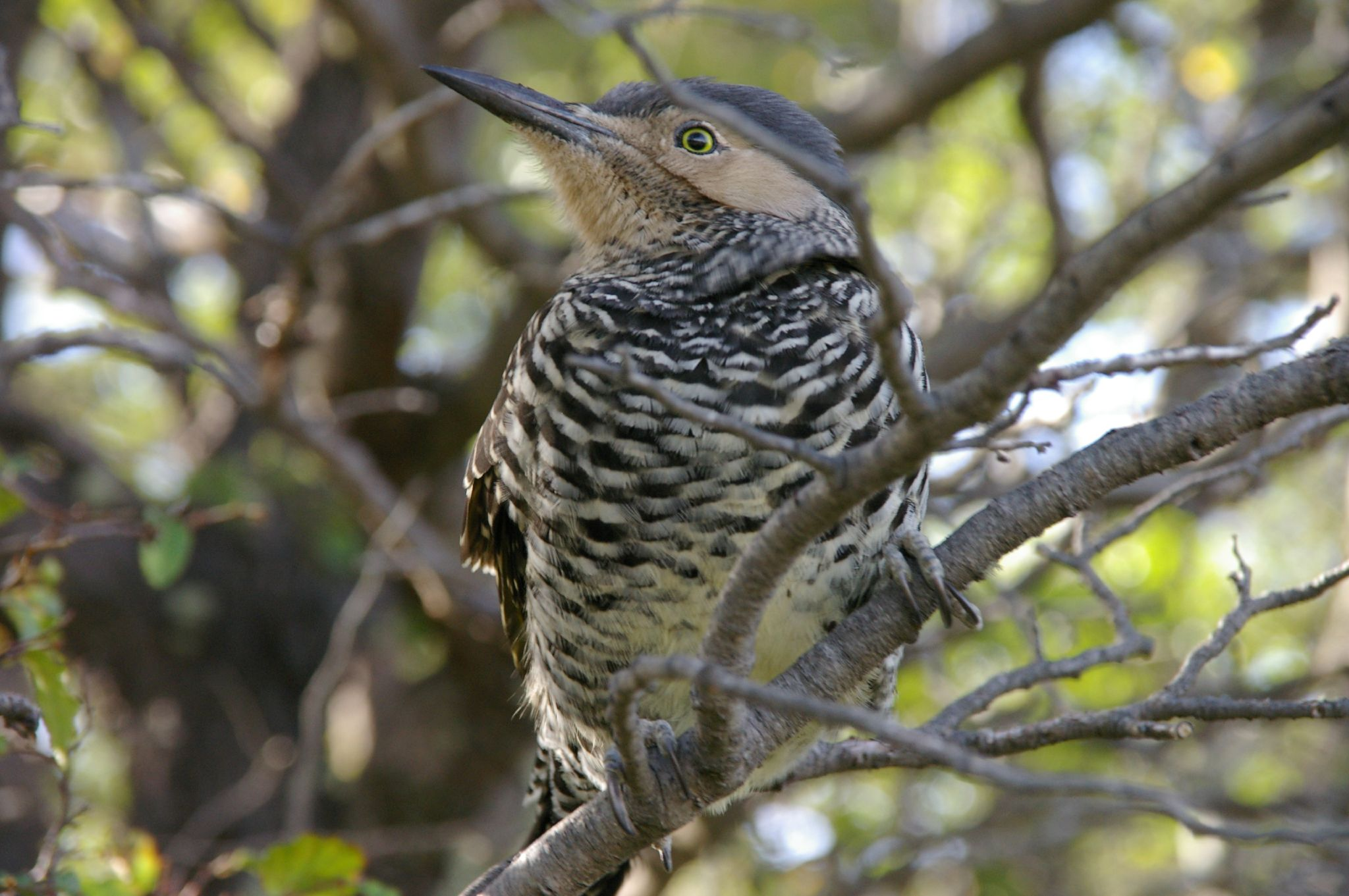

Conservation status
- Least Concern (IUCN 3.1)

Scientific classification
- Kingdom: Animalia
- Phylum: Chordata
- Class: Aves
- Order: Piciformes
- Family: Picidae
- Genus: Colaptes
- Species: C. pitius

Binomial name
- Colaptes pitius (Molina, 1782)

= Chilean flicker =

Species of woodpecker

The Chilean flicker (Colaptes pitius) is a species of bird in subfamily Picinae of the woodpecker family Picidae. It is found in Argentina and Chile.

== Taxonomy and systematics ==
The Chilean flicker was originally described as Picus Pitius. For a time it was put in the monotypic genus Pituipicus that was later merged into Colaptes. The Chilean flicker and Andean flicker (C. rupicola) are sister species.

The Chilean flicker is monotypic.

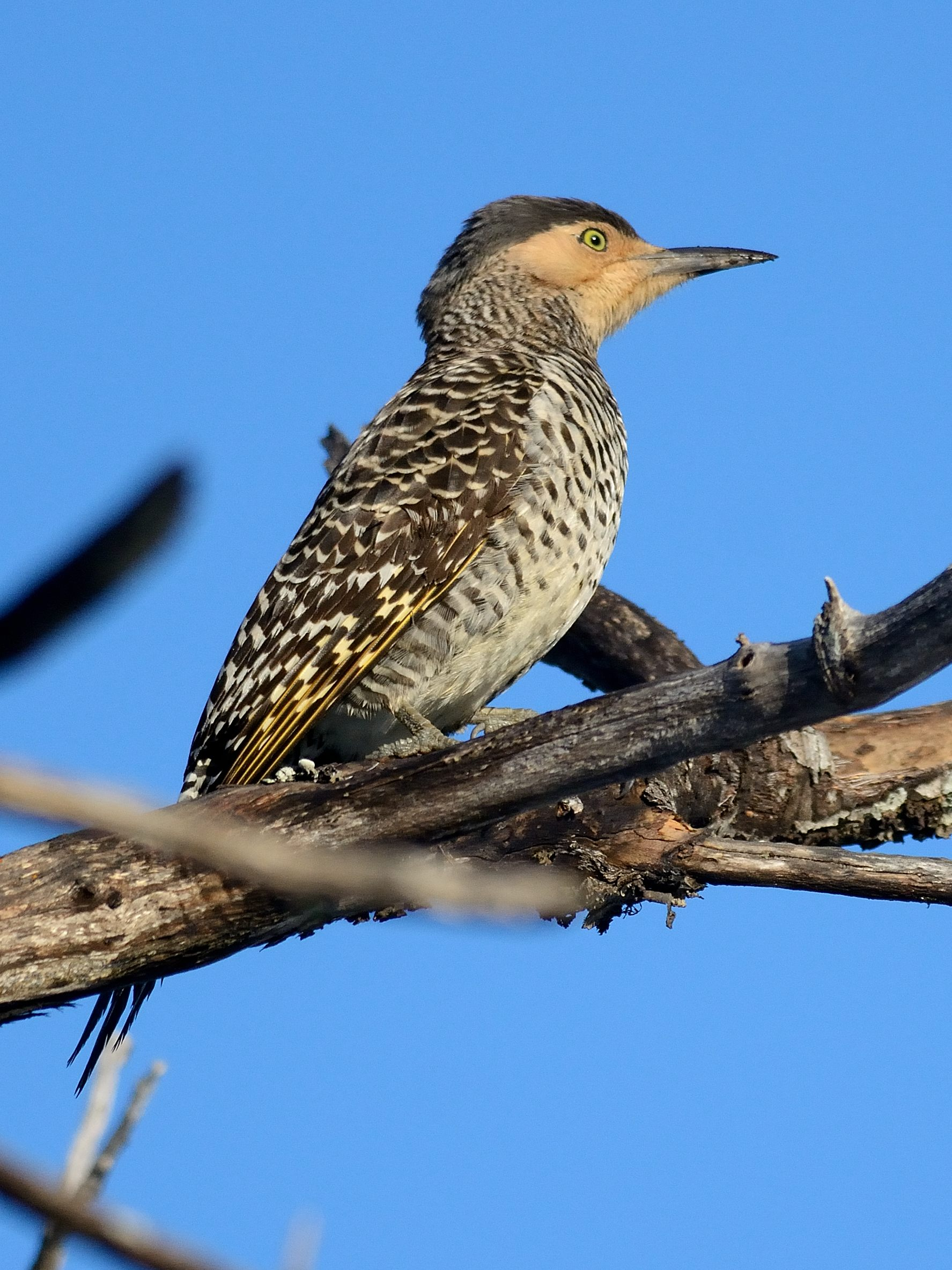
Araucanía, Chile

== Description ==
The Chilean flicker is about 30 cm (12 in) long and weighs 100 to 163 g (3.5 to 5.7 oz). Males and females have the same plumage except on their heads. Adult males are dark slate gray from forehead to nape; the last occasionally has a hint of red. They are buffish from their lores around the eye to the nape with fine black or black and red spots on the malar area that show as a diffuse patch. Their chin and throat are buffish white with black spots on the lower throat. Adult females have a buffish malar area with no spots and never any red on the nape. Both sexes have blackish brown upperparts with narrow white to buff-white bars; their rump is white with sometimes a few black spots. Their flight feathers are dark brown with pale shafts. The top side of their tail is brown-black; the central and outermost feathers have narrow white bars. Their tail's underside is yellowish with ill-defined bars. Their underparts are whitish with wide blackish brown bars on the breast and a mostly plain belly. Their longish bill is black, their iris whitish to yellowish, and the legs gray to green-gray. Juveniles are similar to adults but with brown eyes, a blacker crown, wider bars above, and more spots below.

== Distribution and habitat ==
The Chilean flicker is found in central and southern Chile from the Coquimbo Region to central Magallanes Region and in adjacent southwestern Argentina between Neuquén and Santa Cruz provinces. It inhabits the temperate and Mediterranean climate zones. There it favors semi-open to open landscapes like the edges and openings in forest, open woodlands, riparian woodland, tree plantations, and scrublands. In elevation it mostly ranges between 600 and 1,000 m (2,000 and 3,300 ft) though it can be found near sea level in winter.

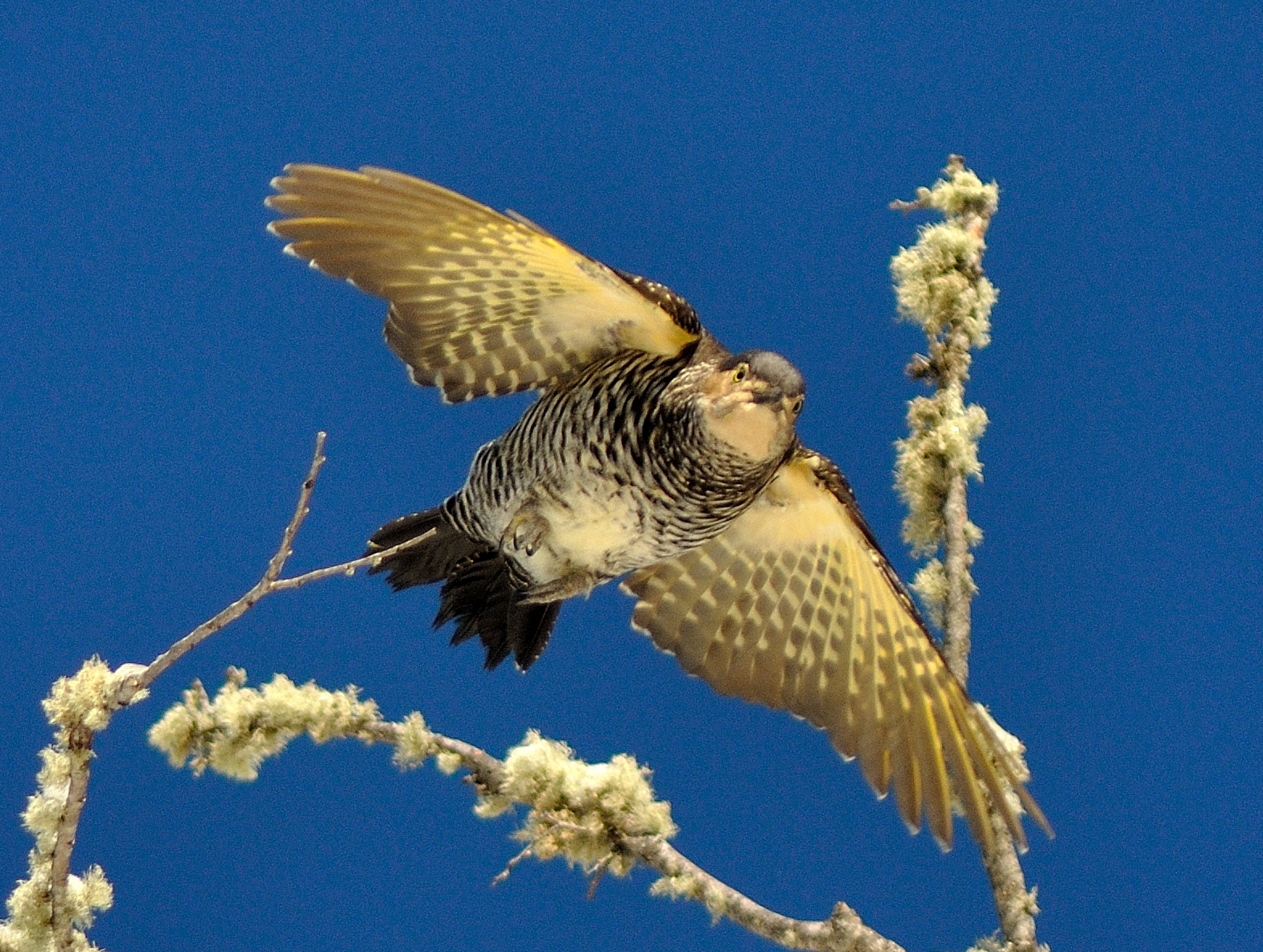
In flight

== Behavior ==
=== Movement ===
The Chilean flicker is mostly resident throughout its range though it might be somewhat nomadic.

=== Feeding ===
The Chilean flicker feeds almost entirely on adult ants, their larvae, and their pupae. It usually forages in family groups, usually on the ground though not far from trees. It hops about, poking, digging, and sweeping aside debris. It will investigate fallen logs and stumps but very rarely forages in trees.

=== Breeding ===
The Chilean flicker's breeding season is believed to be between October and December. It excavates a nest cavity in a dead tree or snag and sometimes in an earthen bank. It is thought to be highly territorial. The clutch size is four to six eggs. The incubation period, time to fledging, and details of parental care are not known.

=== Vocalization ===
The Chilean flicker's vocalizations include "long 'wic wic wic' series", a "whistled variable 'kwee', singly or in series", and a "week-a, week-a".

== Status ==
The IUCN has assessed the Chilean flicker as being of Least Concern. It has a large range, and though its population size is not known it is believed to be stable. No immediate threats have been identified. It occurs in several protected areas and is considered rather common.
