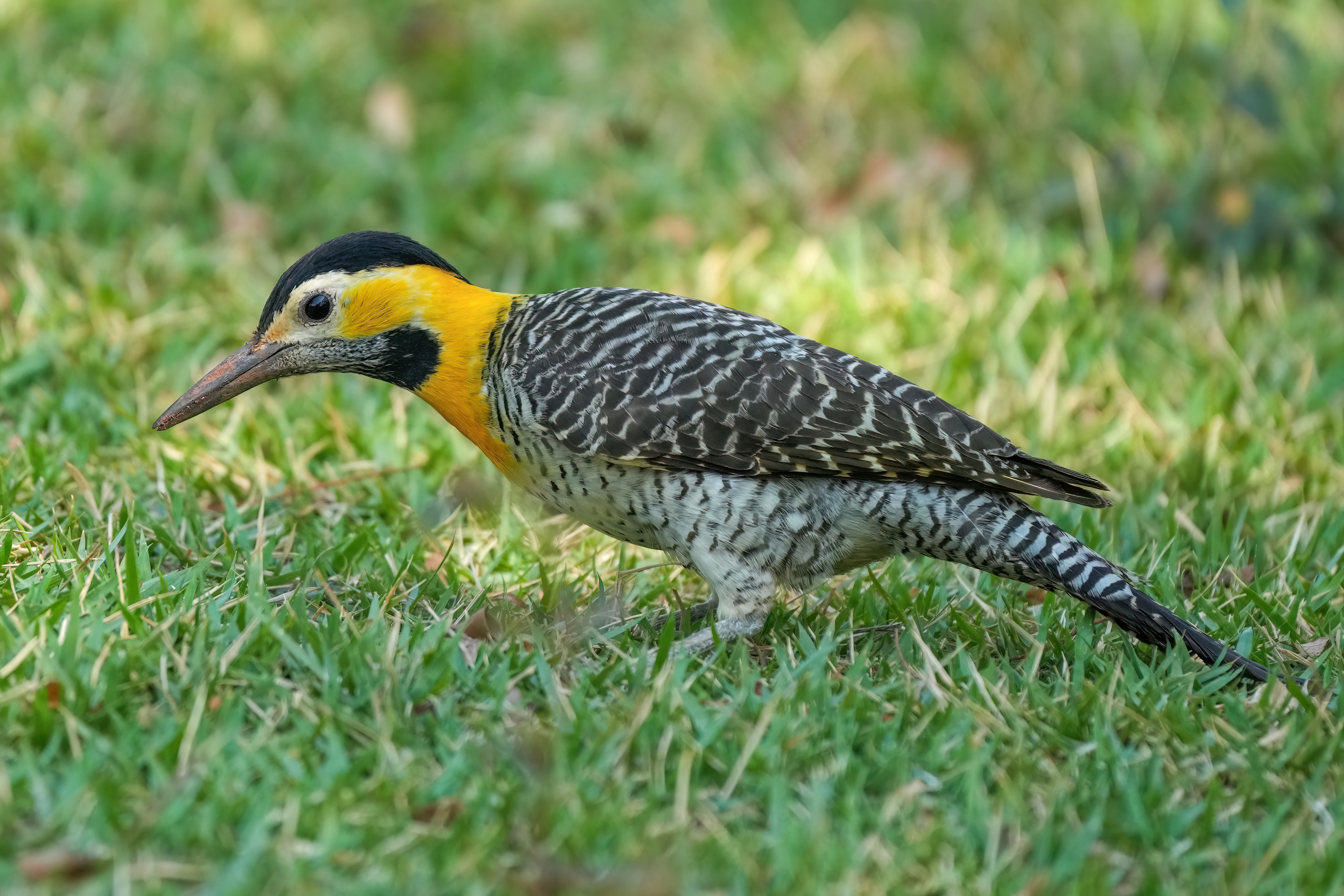
- Female C. c. campestris, the Pantanal, Brazil

Conservation status
- Least Concern (IUCN 3.1)

- Least Concern (IUCN 3.1)

Scientific classification
- Kingdom: Animalia
- Phylum: Chordata
- Class: Aves
- Order: Piciformes
- Family: Picidae
- Genus: Colaptes
- Species: C. campestris

Binomial name
- Colaptes campestris (Vieillot, 1818)

Subspecies
- See text
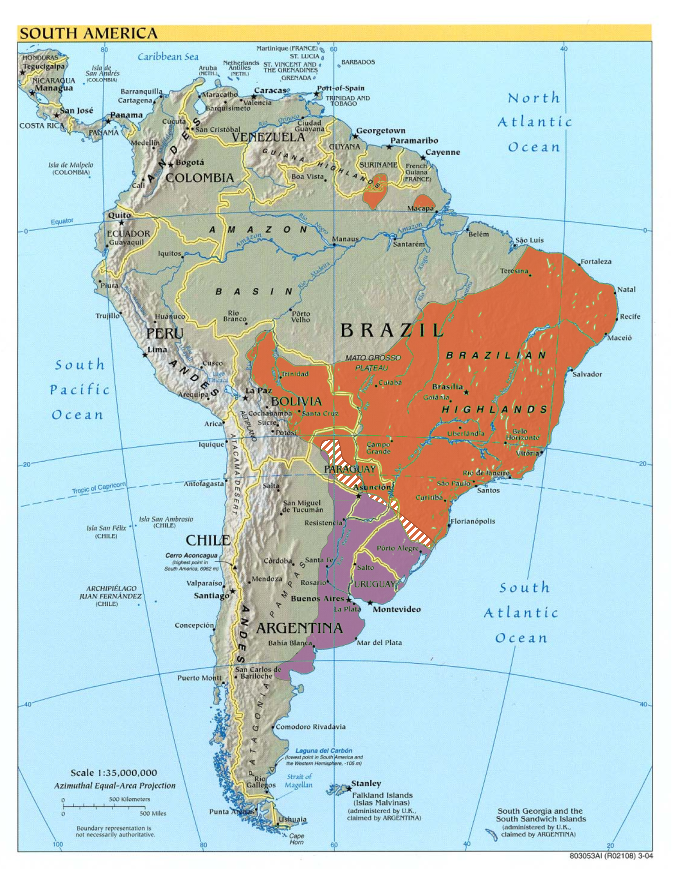
- Distribution of C. c. campestris (orange) and C. c. campestroides (purple)

= Campo flicker =

Species of woodpecker

The campo flicker (Colaptes campestris) is a species of bird in subfamily Picinae of the woodpecker family Picidae. It is found in Argentina, Bolivia, Brazil, Paraguay, Suriname, and Uruguay.

== Taxonomy and systematics ==
The campo flicker was originally described as Picus campestris.

The American Ornithological Society, the International Ornithological Committee, and the Clements taxonomy assign two subspecies to the campo flicker: the nominate C. c. campestris (Vieillot, 1818) and C. c. campestroides (Malherbe, 1849). Since the early 1900s various authors have treated subspecies C. c. campestroides as a separate species, calling it the "field flicker" or "pampas flicker". BirdLife International's Handbook of the Birds of the World (HBW) continues to do so as the pampas flicker.

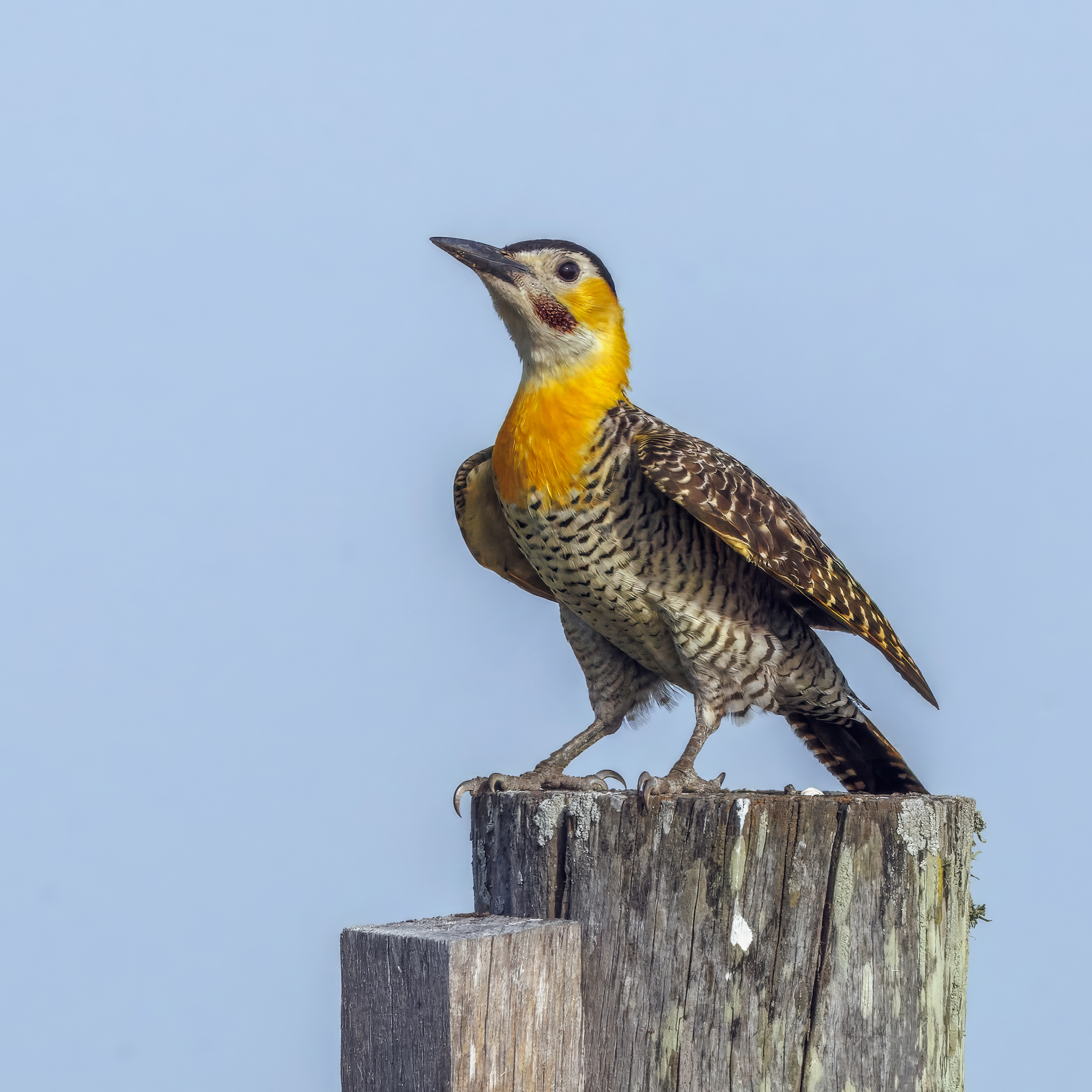
C. c. campestroides
male

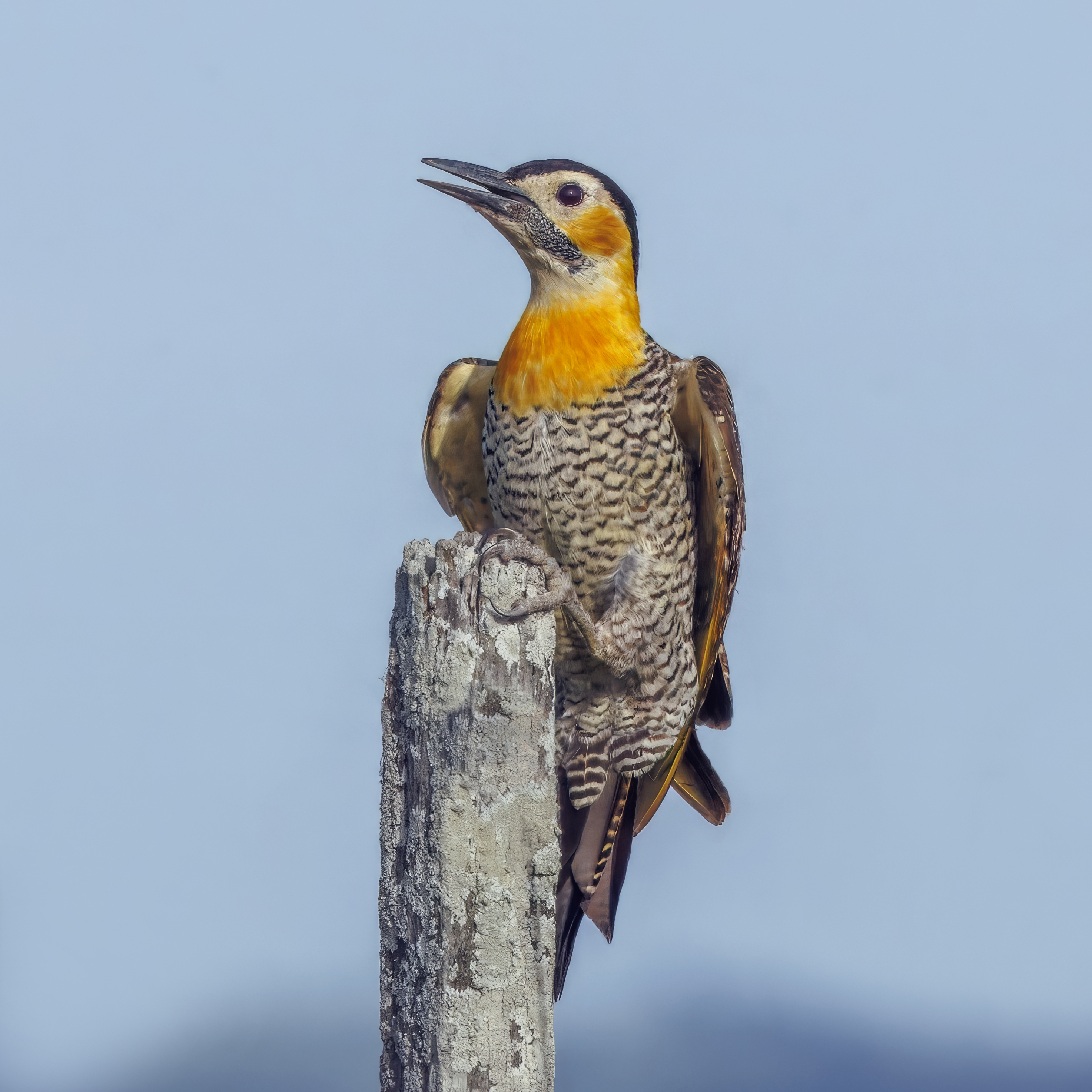
C. c. campestroides
female

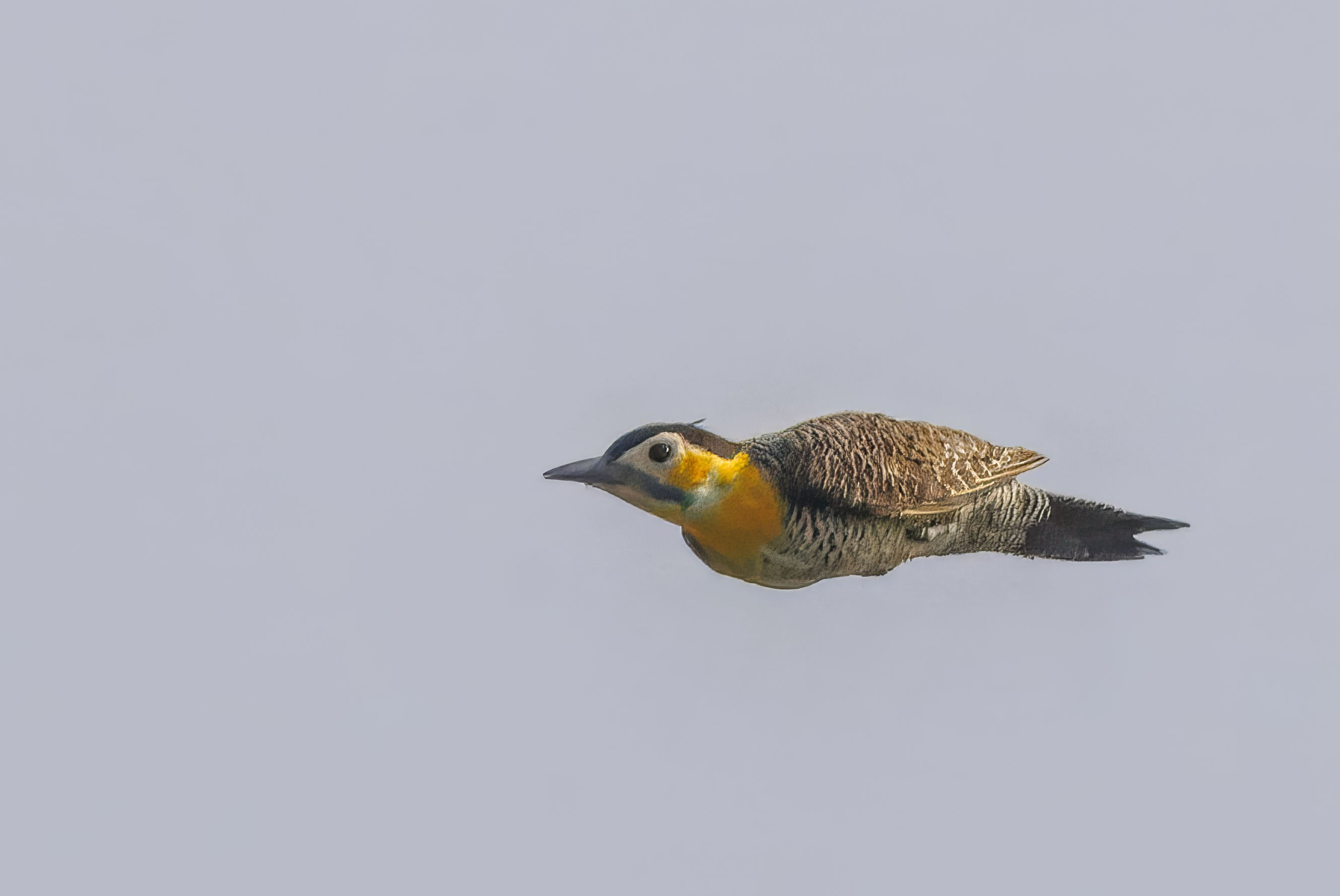
C. c. campestroides
female

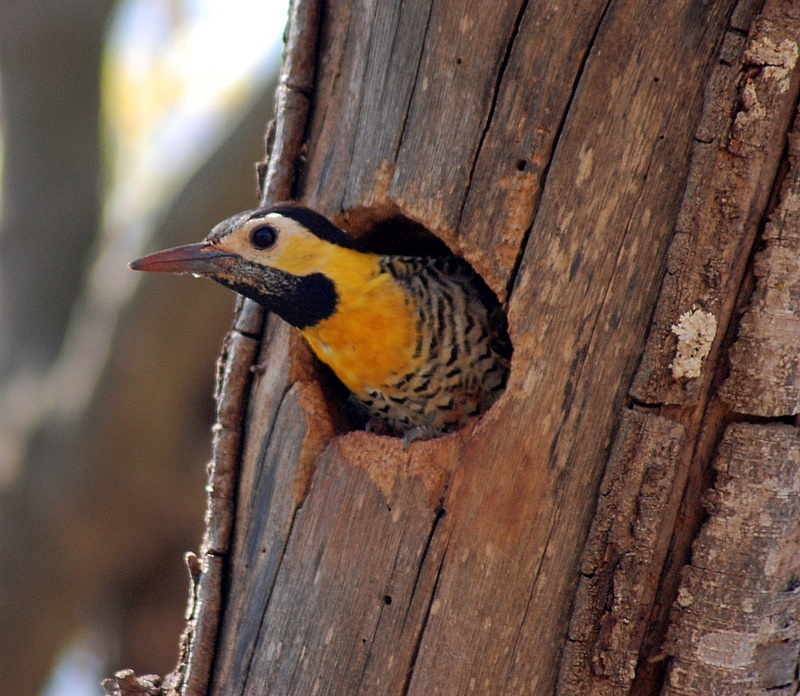
Female C. c. campestris emerging from nest cavity

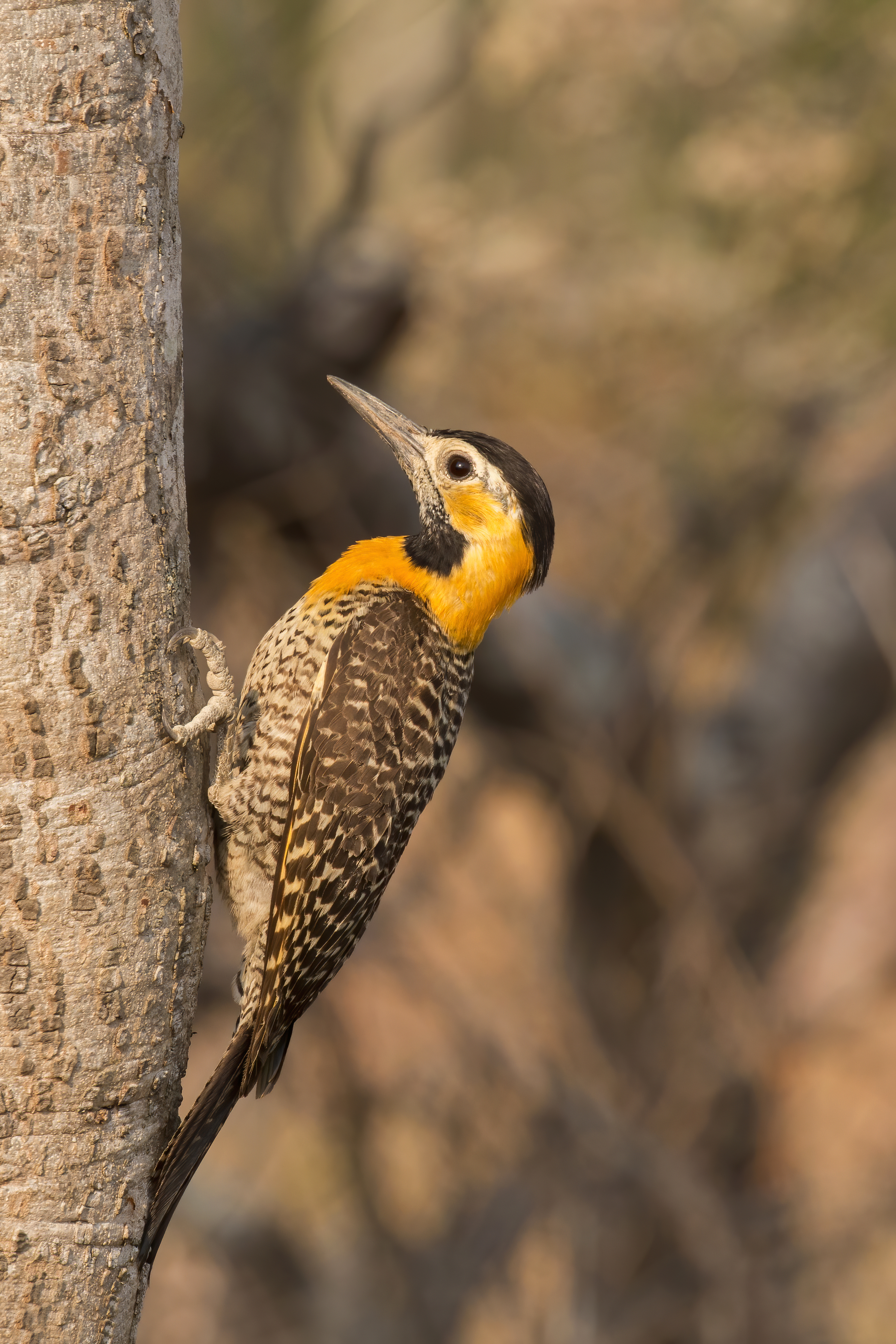
Female C. c. campestris, the Pantanal, Brazil

== Description ==
The campo flicker is about 30 cm (12 in) long and weighs about 150 g (5.3 oz). Males and females have the same plumage except on their faces; males have a red malar stripe and females a black one. Adults of both subspecies have a black crown and a yellow face with white around the eye. Subspecies campestris has a black throat and campestroides a white one, their only difference. Both subspecies' upperparts are brown with dull white bars; their rump is white with a few narrow dark bars. Their flight feathers are brown with yellow shafts. The top side of their tail is black; the central and outermost feathers have thin paler bars. Their tail is brown with white bars on the outermost feathers. Their underparts are white with brown bars. Their long bill is gray, their iris reddish brown, and the legs gray. Juveniles are very similar to adults but with lighter yellow plumage.

== Distribution and habitat ==
The nominate subspecies of campo flicker has several disjunct populations. Three are in southern Suriname and the northern Brazilian states of Pará and Amapá. The fourth, much more extensive one, is from Maranhão in eastern Brazil south and west into Mato Grosso do Sul, central Paraguay, and northern and eastern Bolivia. Subspecies C. c. campestroides is found from central and southern Paraguay, Rio Grande do Sul in Brazil, and Uruguay south into northeastern and eastern Argentina as far as Río Negro Province. The two subspecies hybridize along their contact zone in Paraguay and southern Brazil.

The campo flicker inhabits a wide variety of landscapes, most of them semi-open to open. These include savanna, the Pampas, scrub and gallery forest, the edges of denser forest, Pantanal grasslands, cerrado, and altered landscapes like parks, farmland, and heavily grazed pasture. In various parts of its range it can be found from as low as 80 m (260 ft) or as high as 1,700 m (5,600 ft).

== Behavior ==
=== Movement ===
The campo flicker is a year-round resident in central Brazil and is believed to be resident in the rest of its range as well.

=== Feeding ===
The campo flicker is almost entirely terrestrial in its foraging. It typically feeds in pairs or loose social groups; up to seven birds have been observed together. They peck, dig, and glean for their prey in ant and termite mounds, in the soil, among stones, and in fallen dead wood. Ants and termites form the bulk of their diet; adults, larvae, and pupae are taken. Fruits make up a very small part of their diet.

=== Breeding ===
The campo flicker's breeding season has not been fully defined, but in Argentina and central Brazil it peaks in the dry season of August and September. Both sexes excavate a nest cavity, in a termite mound, earthen bank, tree, or fence post. Studies showed a complex social system in the species with high reproductive conflicts both within and among groups, both due to the new potential breeder or through the effect of group size. The species is "predominantly monogamous in both cooperative groups and socially monogamous pairs, but in several cooperative groups, auxiliary females contributed eggs to the nest" The clutch size is typically four or five eggs. The incubation period, time to fledging, and details of parental care are not known.

=== Vocalization ===
The campo flicker has a large vocal repertoire. Its song is a "rapid 'wicwicwic---'" repeated 10 to 12 times. Calls tend to be high, sharp, and nasal: "tih", "tir", or "wur". Pairs duet with a "high 'wicwicwic' immediately answered by low 'wucwucwuc'."

== Status ==
The IUCN follows HBW taxonomy and so has separately assessed the two subspecies of campo flicker. Both are considered to be of Least Concern. Both have large ranges and unknown population sizes that are believed to be increasing. No immediate threats to either have been identified. The species is "considered common throughout its range." "Although Campo Flicker populations may benefit by the increasing amount of open habitats due to human interventions, alternatively, the species may suffer from the decrease of available nesting sites due to deforestation."
