= List of New World barbets =

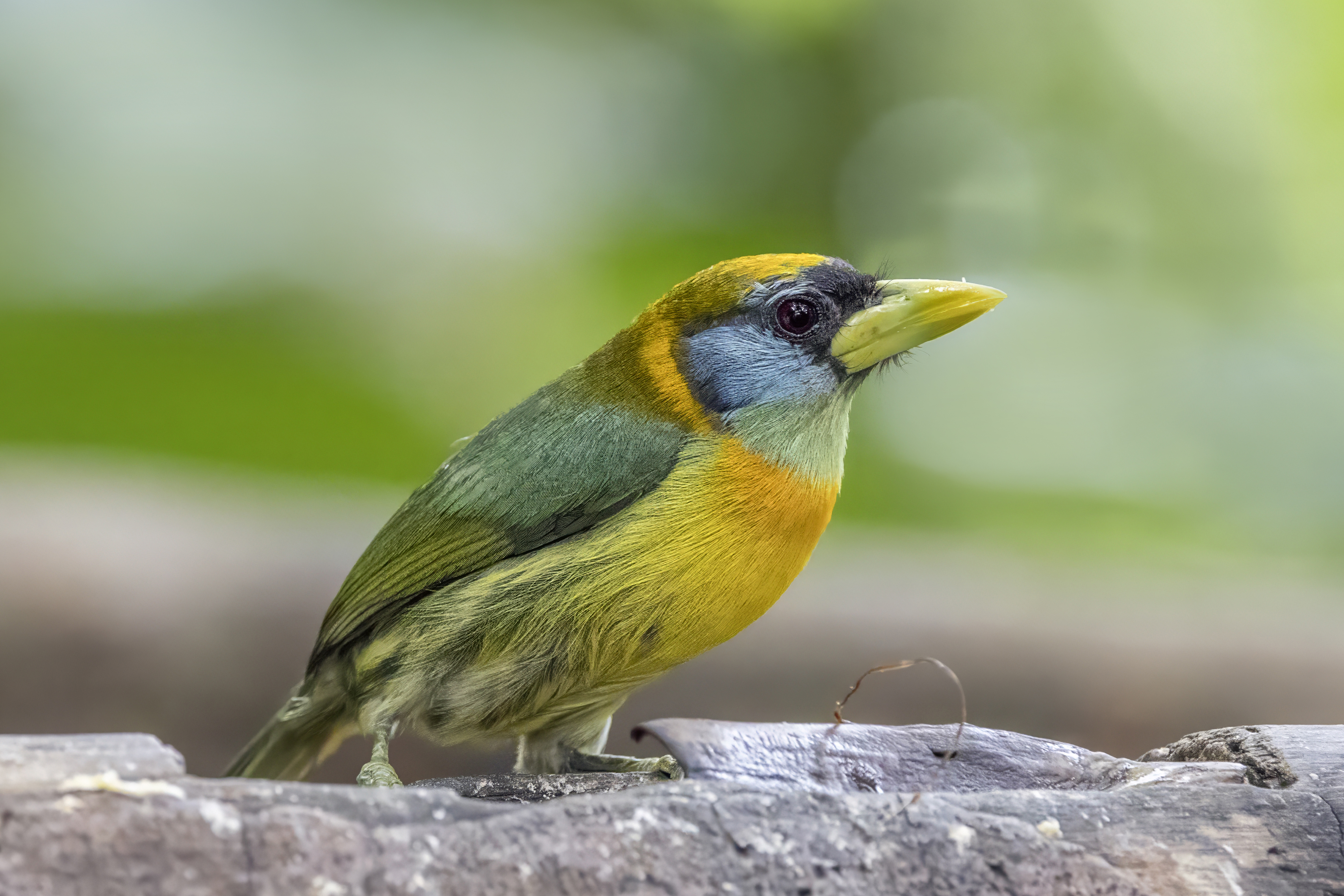
Female red-headed barbet

New World barbets are birds in the family Capitonidae in the order Piciformes. The New World barbets are plump birds, with short necks and large heads. Most species are brightly coloured, with bold patterns of mainly green, red, yellow, white, or black. Their rictal bristles (stiff hair-like feathers at the base of the beak) are shorter and less dense than those of the Asian and African barbets. They are native to the Neotropics of South and Central America, where they inhabit a variety of forests.

There are currently 15 extant species of New World barbets recognised by the International Ornithologists' Union.

== Conventions ==
IUCN Red List categories
Conservation status
- EX: Extinct (0 species)
- EW: Extinct in the wild (0 species)
- CR: Critically endangered (0 species)
- EN: Endangered (0 species)
- VU: Vulnerable (3 species)
- NT: Near threatened (2 species)
- LC: Least concern (8 species)

Conservation status codes listed follow the International Union for Conservation of Nature (IUCN) Red List of Threatened Species. Range maps are provided wherever possible; if a range map is not available, a description of the barbet's range is provided. Ranges are based on the IOC World Bird List for that species unless otherwise noted. Population estimates are of the number of mature individuals and are taken from the IUCN Red List.

This list follows the taxonomic treatment (designation and order of species) and nomenclature (scientific and common names) of version 13.2 of the IOC World Bird List. Where the taxonomy proposed by the IOC World Bird List conflicts with the taxonomy followed by the IUCN (Note: The IUCN follows the taxonomy proposed by the HBW and BirdLife Taxonomic Checklist.) or the 2023 edition of The Clements Checklist of Birds of the World, the disagreement is noted next to the species's common name (for nomenclatural disagreements) or scientific name (for taxonomic disagreements).

== Classification ==
The International Ornithologists' Union (IOU) recognises 15 species of New World barbets in two genera. This list does not include hybrid species, extinct prehistoric species, or putative species not yet accepted by the IOU.

- Piciformes
  - - Galbulidae– Jacamars
    - Bucconidae – Puff birds
  - - - Indicatoridae – Honeyguides
      - Picidae – Woodpeckers
    - - Megalaimidae – Asian barbets
      - - Lybiidae – African barbets
        - - Semnornithidae – Toucan barbets
          - - Capitonidae – New World barbets
            - Ramphastidae – Toucans

Relationships between the families of toucans and barbets, based on a phylogenetic study published in 2015.

Family Capitonidae

- Genus Capito: eleven species
- Genus Eubucco: four species

== New World barbets ==
Genus Capito – Vieillot, 1816 – 11 species
| Common name | Scientific name and subspecies | Range | IUCN status and estimated population |
|---|---|---|---|
| Scarlet-crowned barbet | C. aurovirens Cuvier, 1829 | Western Amazon rainforest | LC Unknown |
| Scarlet-banded barbet | C. wallacei O'Neill and colleagues, 2000 | North-central Peru | VU 250–999 |
| Sira barbet | C. fitzpatricki Seeholzer and colleagues, 2012 | Central Peru | NT 1,000–2,499 |
| Spot-crowned barbet | C. maculicoronatus (Lawrence, 1861) Two subspecies: C. m. maculicoronatus; C. m. rubrilateralis | Panama and northwestern Colombia | LC 50,000–499,999 |
| Orange-fronted barbet | C. squamatus Salvin, 1876 | Southwestern Colombia and western Colombia | LC 37,000–63,000 |
| White-mantled barbet | C. hypoleucus Salvin, 1897 Three subspecies: C. h. hypoleucus; C. h. carrikeri; C. h. extinctus | Northwestern Colombia | VU 1,500–7,000 |
| Black-girdled barbet | C. dayi Cherrie, 1916 | Southern Amazon rainforest | VU Unknown |
| Brown-chested barbet | C. brunneipectus Chapman, 1921 | North-central Brazil | LC 37,000–265,000 |
| Black-spotted barbet | C. niger (Müller, P. L. S., 1776) | Northeastern Amazon rainforest | LC Unknown |
| Gilded barbet | C. auratus (Dumont, 1805) Eight subspecies: C. a. punctatus; C. a. aurantiicinctus; C. a. auratus; C. a. orosae; C. a. amazonicus; C. a. nitidior; C. a. hypochondriacus; C. a. insperatus | North and western Amazon rainforest | LC Unknown |
| Five-colored barbet | C. quinticolor Elliot, D. G., 1865 | Western Colombia and northwestern Ecuador | NT 6,000–10,000 |

Genus Eubucco – Bonaparte, 1850 – 4 species
| Common name | Scientific name and subspecies | Range | IUCN status and estimated population |
|---|---|---|---|
| Lemon-throated barbet | E. richardsoni (Note: The lemon-throated barbet is split into two species by the IUCN: lemon-throated barbet (E. richardsoni) and flame-throated barbet (E. aurantiicollis).) (Gray, G. R., 1846) Four subspecies: E. r. richardsoni; E. r. nigriceps; E. r. aurantiicollis; E. r. purusianus | Western Amazon rainforest | NE Unknown (Note: The lemon-throated barbet is split into two species by the IUCN: lemon-throated barbet (E. richardsoni) and flame-throated barbet (E. aurantiicollis). Both of the species are assessed as being of least concern.) |
| Red-headed barbet | E. bourcierii (Lafresnaye, 1845) Six subspecies: E. b. salvini; E. b. anomalus; E. b. occidentalis; E. b. bourcierii; E. b. bourcierii; E. b. orientalis | Map of range | LC 500,000–4,999,999 |
| Scarlet-hooded barbet | E. tucinkae (Seilern, 1913) | Southwestern Amazon rainforest | LC Unknown |
| Versicolored barbet | E. versicolor (Note: The versicolored barbet is split into three species by the IUCN: blue-moustached barbet (E. versicolor), blue-cowled barbet (E. steerii) and blue-chinned barbet (E. glaucogularis).) (Müller, P. L. S., 1776) Three subspecies: E. v. steerii; E. v. versicolor; E. v. glaucogularis | Map of range | NE Unknown (Note: The versicolored barbet is split into three species by the IUCN: blue-moustached barbet (E. versicolor), blue-cowled barbet (E. steerii) and blue-chinned barbet (E. glaucogularis). The blue-moustached and blue-cowled barbets are assessed as being of least concern, while the blue-chinned barbet is assessed as being near-threatened.) |
