= List of Piciformes by population =

This is a list of Piciformes species by global population. While numbers are estimates, they have been made by the experts in their fields. For more information on how these estimates were ascertained, see Wikipedia's articles on population biology and population ecology.

This list is not comprehensive, as not all Piciformes have had their numbers quantified.

The IOC World Bird List (version 15.1) recognizes 448 species of Piciformes, one of which is extinct. This list follows IUCN classifications for species names and taxonomy. Where IUCN classifications differ from other ornithological authorities, alternative names and taxonomies are noted.

One member of Piciformes is extinct:

- Bermuda flicker (Colaptes oceanicus) - likely went extinct by mid-17th century.

== Species by global population ==
Common name	Binomial name	Population	Status	Trend	Notes	Image
Imperial woodpecker	Campephilus imperialis	1-49	CR	?	May be extinct. Last confirmed record from 1956.	
Ivory-billed woodpecker	Campephilus principalis	1-49	CR	?	May be extinct. Last confirmed record from 1944.	
Okinawa woodpecker	Dendrocopos noguchii	75-400	EN	Steady	Best estimate for number of mature individuals is 100–300.	
Scarlet-banded barbet	Capito wallacei	250-999	VU	▼		
White-rumped woodpecker (Zebra woodpecker)	Meiglyptes tristis	250-1,000	EN	▼		
Fernandina's flicker	Colaptes fernandinae	600-800	EN	▼		
Helmeted woodpecker	Celeus galeatus	700-21,000	VU	▼	Best estimate for number of mature individuals is 3,600.	
Sira barbet	Capito fitzpatricki	1,000-2,499	NT	Steady		
Andaman woodpecker	Dryocopus hodgei	1,000-2,499	VU	▼		
Knysna woodpecker	Campethera notata	1,000-3,300	NT	Steady	Total population is estimated to be 1,500-5,000 individuals.	
Yellow-faced flameback	Chrysocolaptes xanthocephalus	1,100-5,500	EN	▼	Best estimate for number of mature individuals is 1,100-2,200.	
Three-toed jacamar	Jacamaralcyon tridactyla	1,300-5,400	NT	▼	Total population is estimated to be 1,962-8,028 individuals.	
Sulu pygmy woodpecker	Picoides ramsayi	2,000-10,000	VU	▼	Best estimate for number of mature individuals is 2,000-5,000.	
Yellow-browed toucanet	Aulacorhynchus huallagae	2,500-9,999	NT	Steady		
Sumatran woodpecker	Picus dedemi	2,500-9,999	NT	▼		
Zambian barbet (Chaplin's barbet)	Lybius chaplini	4,500-5,200	VU	▼		
Red-headed flameback	Chrysocolaptes erythrocephalus	5,000-7,500	NT	▼	Total population is estimated to be 7,500-11,250 individuals.	
Red-faced barbet	Lybius rubrifacies	5,000-10,000	NT	▼		
Southern sooty woodpecker	Mulleripicus fuliginosus	5,000-10,000	VU	▼		
Javan flameback	Chrysocolaptes strictus	5,000-20,000	NT	▼		
Blue-chinned barbet (Versicolored barbet)	Eubucco glaucogularis	5,000-40,000	NT	▼	Note than IUCN/BirdLife International splits versicolored barbet into three distinct species: blue-chinned, blue-cowled, and blue-moustached barbets. IOC maintains all three species within versicolored barbet (E. versicolor).	
Kaempfer's woodpecker	Celeus obrieni	6,000	VU	▼		
Five-coloured barbet	Capito quinticolor	6,000-10,000	NT	▼		
Spot-throated flameback	Dinopium everetti	6,600-20,000	NT	▼	Total population is estimated to be 9,400-28,000 individuals.	
Sooty-capped puffbird	Nystactes noanamae	8,000	NT	▼	Total population is estimated to be 12,000 individuals.	
Plate-billed mountain toucan	Andigena laminirostris	10,000-19,999	NT	▼		
Arabian woodpecker	Dendroptes dorae	10,000-19,999	NT	▼	IUCN/BirdLife International maintain this species in genus Dendropicos.	
White-mantled barbet	Capito hypoleucus	10,000-19,999	LC	▼		
Javan yellownape (Checker-throated woodpecker)	Chrysophlegma mentale	10,000-20,000	LC	Steady		
Great slaty woodpecker	Mulleripicus pulverulentus	10,000-70,000	VU	▼		
Guadeloupe woodpecker	Melanerpes herminieri	16,000	LC	▲	Total population is estimated to be 24,000 individuals.	
Red-cockaded woodpecker	Leuconotopicus borealis	19,000	NT	▼		
Toucan barbet	Semnornis ramphastinus	20,000-49,999	NT	▼		
Dusky-backed jacamar	Brachygalba salmoni	20,000-49,999	LC	▼		
Grey-crowned woodpecker	Colaptes auricularis	20,000-49,999	LC	▼		
Blue-cowled barbet (Versicolored barbet)	Eubucco steerii	20,000-49,999	LC	▼	Note than IUCN/BirdLife International splits versicolored barbet into three distinct species: blue-chinned, blue-cowled, and blue-moustached barbets. IOC maintains all three species within versicolored barbet (E. versicolor).	
Strickland's woodpecker	Leuconotopicus stricklandi	20,000-49,999	LC	▼		
Grey-breasted woodpecker	Melanerpes hypopolius	20,000-49,999	LC	▼		
Golden-naped woodpecker	Melanerpes chrysauchen	20,000-49,999	LC	▼		
Grey-cheeked nunlet	Nonnula frontalis	20,000-49,999	LC	▼		
Stripe-cheeked woodpecker	Piculus callopterus	20,000-49,999	LC	▼		
Prong-billed barbet	Semnornis frantzii	20,000-49,999	LC	Steady		
Grey-breasted mountain toucan	Andigena hypoglauca	25,000-77,000	LC	▼	Total population is estimated to be 36,800-114,400 individuals.	
Guayaquil woodpecker	Campephilus gayaquilensis	25,000-150,000	LC	▼		
Orange-fronted barbet	Capito squamatus	37,000-63,000	LC	▼		
Brown-chested barbet	Capito brunneipectus	37,000-265,000	LC	▼		
Coppery-chested jacamar	Galbula pastazae	42,000	LC	▼		
Yellow-browed woodpecker	Piculus aurulentus	50,000-100,000	LC	▼		
Keel-billed toucan	Ramphastos sulfuratus	50,000-499,999	NT	▼		
Pale-billed woodpecker	Campephilus guatemalensis	50,000-499,999	LC	▼		
Spot-crowned barbet	Capito maculicoronatus	50,000-499,999	LC	▼		
Chestnut-colored woodpecker	Celeus castaneus	50,000-499,999	LC	▼		
Cinnamon woodpecker	Celeus loricatus	50,000-499,999	LC	▼		
Smoky-brown woodpecker	Leuconotopicus fumigatus	50,000-499,999	LC	▼		
White-whiskered puffbird	Malacoptila panamensis	50,000-499,999	LC	▼		
Golden-cheeked woodpecker	Melanerpes chrysogenys	50,000-499,999	LC	Steady		
Hoffmann's woodpecker	Melanerpes hoffmannii	50,000-499,999	LC	▲		
Black-cheeked woodpecker	Melanerpes pucherani	50,000-499,999	LC	▼		
Yucatan woodpecker	Melanerpes pygmaeus	50,000-499,999	LC	▼		
Lanceolated monklet	Micromonacha lanceolata	50,000-499,999	LC	▼		
Black-breasted puffbird	Notharchus pectoralis	50,000-499,999	LC	▼		
Barred puffbird	Nystalus radiatus	50,000-499,999	LC	▼		
Rufous-winged woodpecker	Piculus simplex	50,000-499,999	LC	▼		
Fiery-billed araçari	Pteroglossus frantzii	50,000-499,999	LC	▼		
Yellow-eared toucanet	Selenidera spectabilis	50,000-499,999	LC	▼		
Lewis's woodpecker	Melanerpes lewis	53,000-120,000	LC	▲		
Greater crescent-chested puffbird (Crescent-chested puffbird)	Malacoptila striata	72,000-129,000	LC	▼	Total population is estimated to be 107,000 - 193,000 individuals. Note that IUCN/BirdLife International split crescent-chested puffbird into greater and lesser crescent-chested puffbird (M. minor; unknown population). IOC maintains both species within M. striata.	
Saffron toucanet	Pteroglossus bailloni	100,000-499,999	NT	▼		
Arizona woodpecker	Leuconotopicus arizonae	200,000	LC	▼		
Williamson's sapsucker	Sphyrapicus thyroideus	210,000-400,000	LC	▼		
White-headed woodpecker	Leuconotopicus albolarvatus	240,000	LC	▲		
Iberian green woodpecker	Picus sharpei	488,000-938,000	LC	▼		
Spot-breasted woodpecker	Colaptes punctigula	500,000-4,999,999	LC	Steady		
Red-headed barbet	Eubucco bourcierii	500,000-4,999,999	LC	▼		
Rufous-tailed jacamar	Galbula ruficauda	500,000-4,999,999	LC	▼		
Great jacamar	Jacamerops aureus	500,000-4,999,999	LC	▼		
Red-crowned woodpecker	Melanerpes rubricapillus	500,000-4,999,999	LC	Steady		
White-necked puffbird	Notharchus hyperrhynchus	500,000-4,999,999	LC	▼		
Golden-green woodpecker	Piculus chrysochloros	500,000-4,999,999	LC	▼		
Olivaceous piculet	Picumnus olivaceus	500,000-4,999,999	LC	▼		
Yellow-throated toucan	Ramphastos ambiguus	500,000-4,999,999	LC	▼		
Red-rumped woodpecker	Veniliornis kirkii	500,000-4,999,999	LC	▼		
Ochraceous piculet	Picumnus limae	600,000-700,000	LC	Steady	Total population is estimated to be 1.0 million individuals.	
Middle spotted woodpecker	Dendrocoptes medius	600,000-1,399,999	LC	▲	IUCN/BirdLife International maintain this species in genus Leiopicus.	
Gilded flicker	Colaptes chrysoides	770,000	LC	Steady		
Syrian woodpecker	Dendrocopos syriacus	806,000-1,930,000	LC	?		
Nuttall's woodpecker	Dryobates nuttallii	850,000	LC	Steady		
Grey-faced woodpecker (Grey-headed woodpecker)	Picus canus	913,000-1,520,000	LC	▲	Note that IUCN/BirdLife International use the common name "grey-headed woodpecker" to refer to Dendropicos spodocephalus, or eastern grey woodpecker.	
Eurasian green woodpecker (European green woodpecker)	Picus viridis	1,260,000-2,160,000	LC	Steady		
White-backed woodpecker	Dendrocopos leucotos	1,320,000-3,350,000	LC	▼		
Gila woodpecker	Melanerpes uropygialis	1,500,000	LC	Steady		
Black-backed woodpecker	Picoides arcticus	1,700,000	LC	Steady		
Red-headed woodpecker	Melanerpes erythrocephalus	1,800,000	LC	▼	While IUCN/BirdLife International do not report a population estimate, a population estimate for mature individuals is available from Partners in Flight.	
Red-naped sapsucker	Sphyrapicus nuchalis	2,000,000	LC	▼		
Lesser spotted woodpecker	Dryobates minor	2,100,000-4,799,999	LC	▼		
Red-breasted sapsucker	Sphyrapicus ruber	2,300,000	LC	▼		
Pileated woodpecker	Dryocopus pileatus	2,600,000	LC	▲	IUCN/BirdLife International maintain this species in genus Hylatomus.	
Black woodpecker	Dryocopus martius	3,540,000-6,490,000	LC	▼		
Eurasian wryneck	Jynx torquilla	3,980,000-7,600,000	LC	Steady		
Three-toed woodpecker	Picoides tridactylus	4,010,000-4,950,000	LC	?	Note that IOC taxonomy splits this species into Eurasian and American three-toed woodpecker (P.dorsalis). IUCN/BirdLife International maintain both species within P. tridactylus.	
Crimson-crested woodpecker	Campephilus melanoleucos	5,000,000-50,000,000	LC	▼		
Lineated woodpecker	Hylatomus lineatus	5,000,000-50,000,000	LC	▲		
White-fronted nunbird	Monasa morphoeus	5,000,000-50,000,000	LC	▼		
Golden-fronted woodpecker	Melanerpes aurifrons	5,300,000	LC	Steady		
Ladder-backed woodpecker	Dryobates scalaris	5,500,000	LC	Steady	Note that banner population estimate on IUCN reference is for U.S. & Canada only.	
Acorn woodpecker	Melanerpes formicivorus	7,500,000	LC	▲	Note that banner population estimate on IUCN reference is for U.S. & Canada only.	
Hairy woodpecker	Leuconotopicus villosus	8,900,000	LC	▲		
Yellow-shafted flicker (Northern flicker)	Colaptes auratus	12,000,000	LC	▼	Note that IUCN/BirdLife International split northern flicker into yellow- and red-shafted flicker (C. cafer; unknown population). IOC maintains both species within C. auratus.	
Downy woodpecker	Dryobates pubescens	13,000,000	LC	Steady		
Yellow-bellied sapsucker	Sphyrapicus varius	14,000,000	LC	▲		
Red-bellied woodpecker	Melanerpes carolinus	14,000,000-17,000,000	LC	▲		
Great spotted woodpecker	Dendrocopos major	49,000,000-78,000,000	LC	▼		

== Species without population estimates ==
Common name	Binomial name	Population	Status	Trend	Notes	Image
Black-bodied woodpecker	Hylatomus schulzii	unknown	NT	▼		
Speckle-chested piculet	Picumnus steindachneri	unknown	NT	▼		
Emerald toucanet	Aulacorhynchus prasinus	unknown	LC	▼		
Golden-olive woodpecker	Colaptes rubiginosus	unknown	LC	▼		
Blue-moustached barbet	Eubucco versicolor	unknown	LC	▼	Note than IUCN/BirdLife International splits versicolored barbet into three distinct species: blue-chinned, blue-cowled, and blue-moustached barbets. IOC maintains all three species within versicolored barbet (E. versicolor).	

== See also ==
- Lists of birds by population
- Lists of organisms by population
