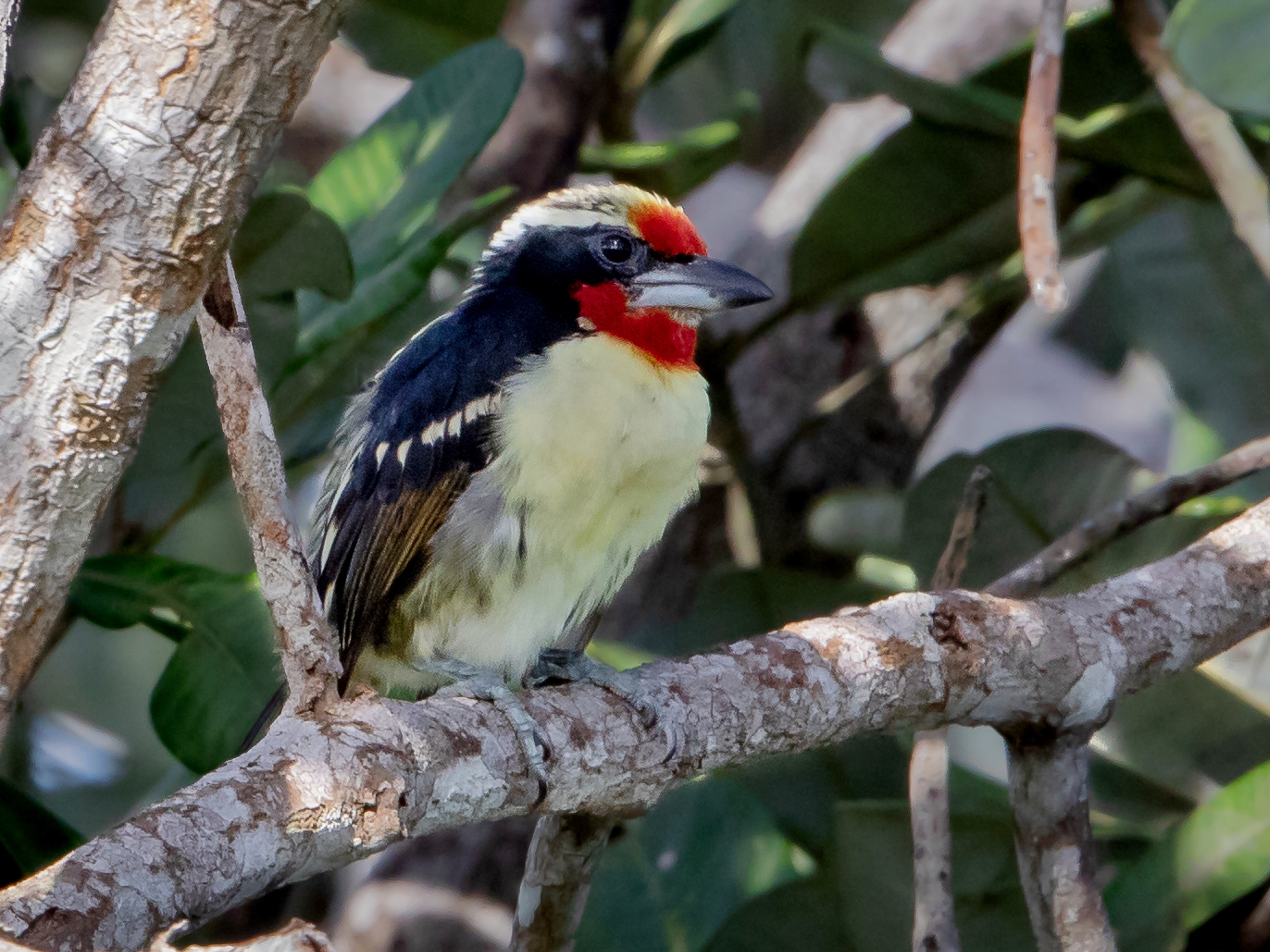

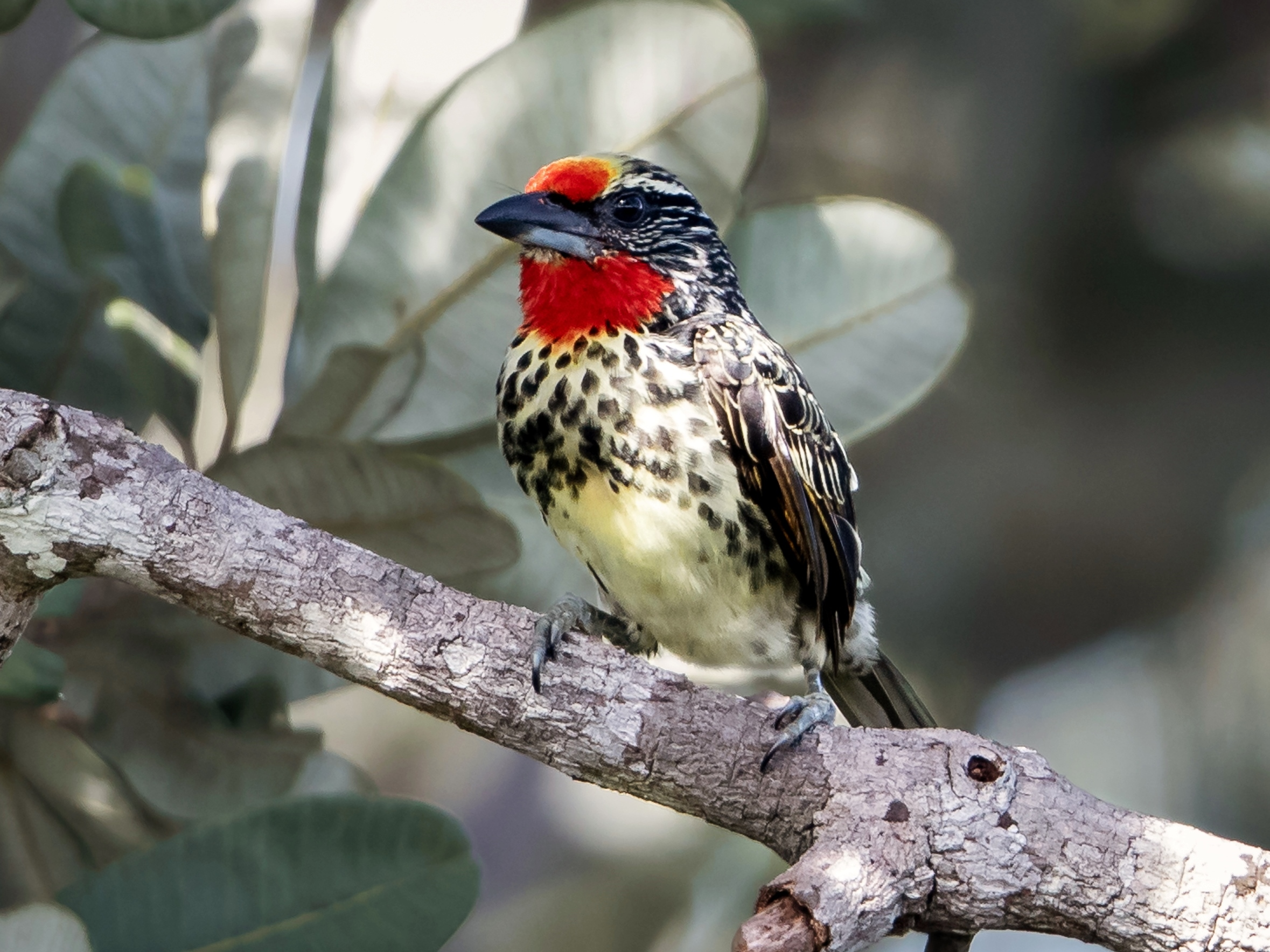
- male and female

Conservation status
- Least Concern (IUCN 3.1)

Scientific classification
- Kingdom: Animalia
- Phylum: Chordata
- Class: Aves
- Order: Piciformes
- Family: Capitonidae
- Genus: Capito
- Species: C. niger

Binomial name
- Capito niger (Müller, PLS, 1776)
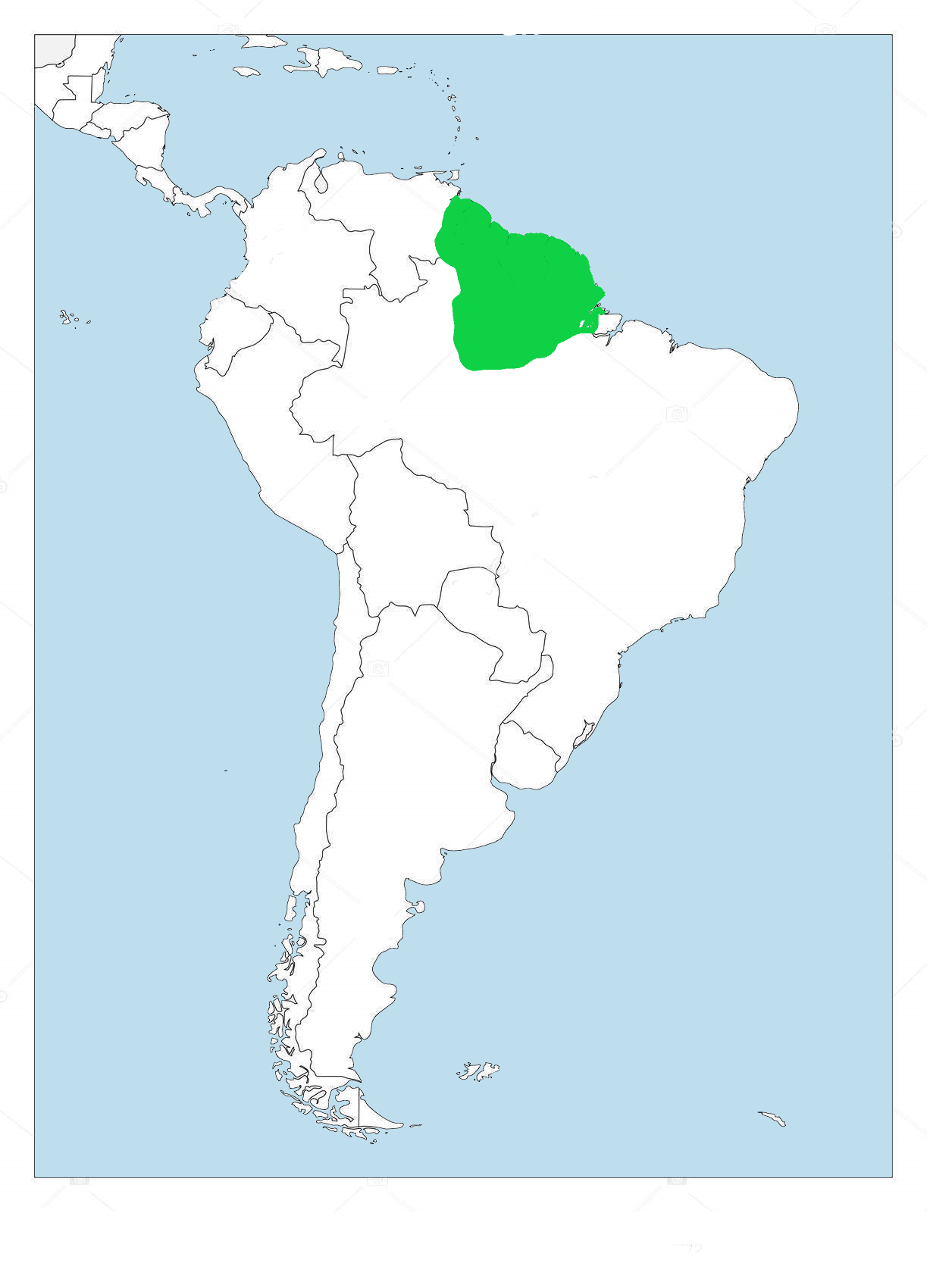

= Black-spotted barbet =

Species of bird

The black-spotted barbet (Capito niger) is a species of bird in the family Capitonidae, the New World barbets. It is found in Brazil, the Guianas, and Venezuela.

== Taxonomy ==
The black-spotted barbet was formally described in 1776 by the German zoologist Philipp Statius Müller under the binomial name Bucco niger. Müller based his account on the "Tamatia à tête et gorge rouge" from Cayenne that had been described in 1780 by the French naturalist, the Comte de Buffon. The specific epithet niger is Latin meaning "black". The black-spotted barbet is now placed with ten other species in the genus Capito that was introduced in 1816 by the French ornithologist Louis Vieillot. The species is monotypic: no subspecies are recognised.

Until the late 20th century, the black-spotted barbet was considered to be a conspecific with the widespread gilded barbet (Capito auratus). The black-spotted, gilded, and brown-chested barbets (C. brunneipectus) apparently form a superspecies.

== Description ==
The black-spotted barbet is 16 to 19 cm (6.3 to 7.5 in) long and weighs 41 to 68 g (1.4 to 2.4 oz). It is intricately colored, with much variation in the richness of the colors. The adult male has a red forehead, a yellowish crown and nape, and a black band from the lores to the nape. The nape has dusky streaks. Its upperside is black; its mantle is outlined yellowish and it has yellowish wingbars. Its throat is red, the breast and belly yellow, and the flanks yellow with an olive tinge and black streaks. The adult female is similarly colored but more heavily marked; its upperparts have pale flecks on the black and the breast and belly are spotted or streaked. The immatures are similar to the adults but duller.

== Distribution and habitat ==
The black-spotted barbet is found in the eastern parts of Venezuela's Bolívar and Delta Amacuro states, the three countries of the Guianas, and the Brazilian states of Roraima, Pará, and Amapá north of the Amazon River. It inhabits the interiors of a variety of forest types including terra firme, riparian, and várzea. It also uses the forest edges and more open terrain such as gardens and plantations. In elevation it ranges from sea level up to 200 m (660 ft) in Venezuela and as high as 800 m (2,600 ft) in the Guianas.

== Behavior ==
=== Feeding ===
Though little is known about the black-spotted barbet's diet and foraging habits, they are assumed to be similar to those of the gilded barbet.

=== Breeding ===
The black-spotted barbet breeds from September to May and possibly to July. Pairs excavate a cavity in a tree 5 to 12 m (16 to 39 ft) above ground. The female lays three or four eggs and both parents incubate them.

=== Vocalization ===
The black-spotted barbet's song is "double, sometimes single, low 'wú-woot' notes" . Its call is a scratchy croak .

== Status ==
The IUCN has assessed the black-spotted barbet as being of Least Concern. Though its population has not been quantified, the species is uncommon to widespread in its range and occurs in several protected areas.
