= C. europaeus =

C. europaeus may refer to:

- Capitonides europaeus, an extinct bird species from the Middle Miocene of southern Germany
- Caprimulgus europaeus, the European nightjar, a bird species found in most of Europe and temperate Asia
