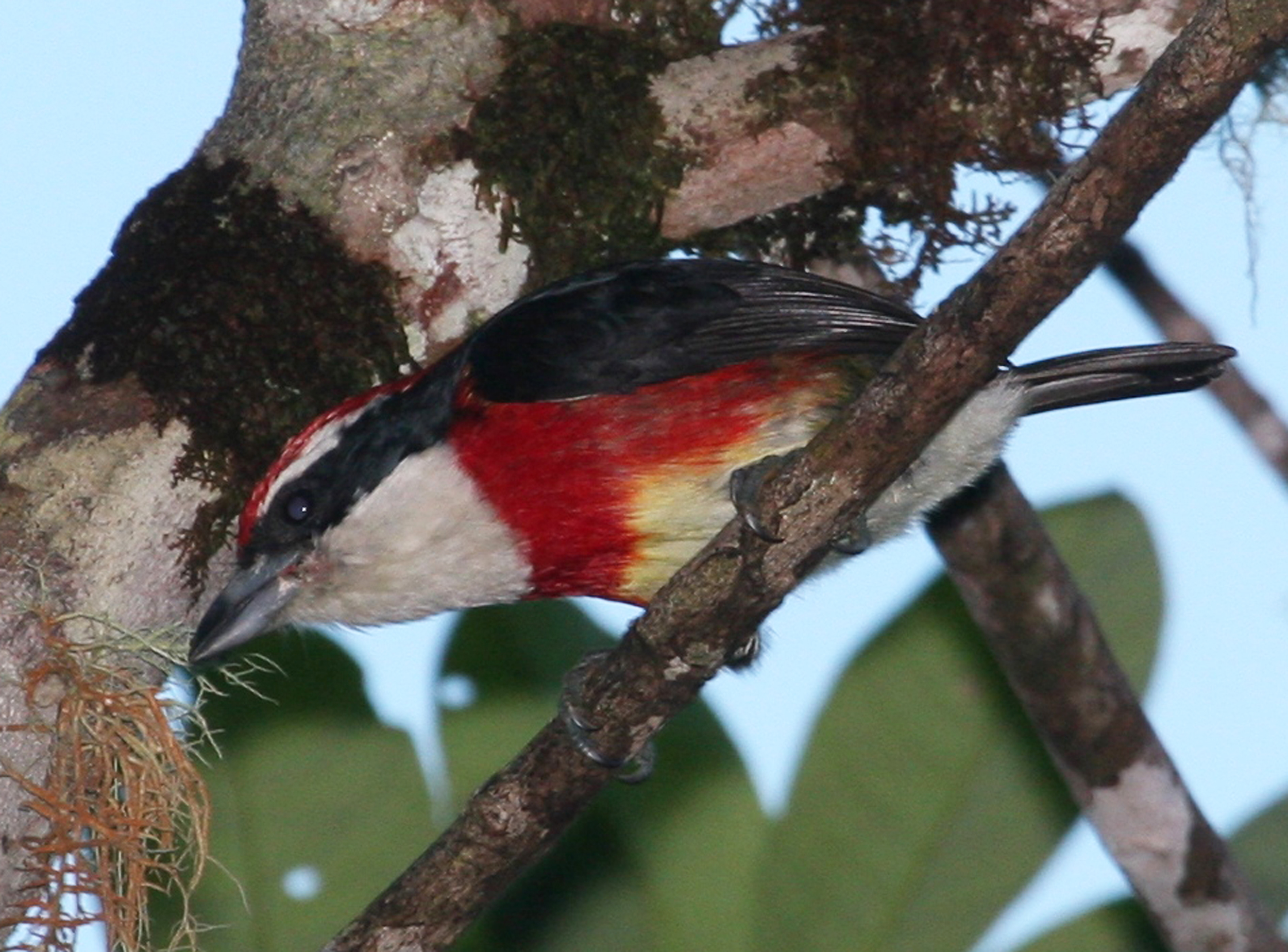

Conservation status
- Near Threatened (IUCN 3.1)

Scientific classification
- Kingdom: Animalia
- Phylum: Chordata
- Class: Aves
- Order: Piciformes
- Family: Capitonidae
- Genus: Capito
- Species: C. fitzpatricki

Binomial name
- Capito fitzpatricki Seeholzer, Winger, Harvey, Cáceres A & Weckstein, 2012
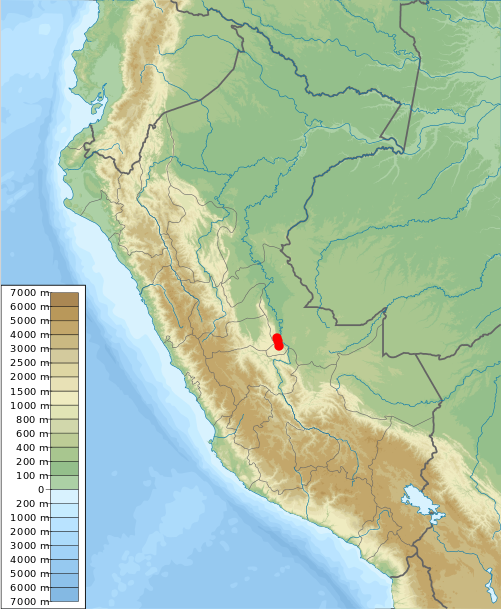
- ● collection localities

Synonyms
- Capito wallacei fitzpatricki

= Sira barbet =

Species of bird

The Sirá barbet (Capito fitzpatricki) is a bird in the family Capitonidae, the New World barbets. It is endemic to the Cerros del Sira of east-central Peru.

== Taxonomy and systematics ==
The Sira barbet was discovered in 2008 and formally described in 2012. The International Ornithological Committee (IOC) has accepted it as a valid species. However, the South American Classification Committee of the American Ornithological Society (AOS) and the Clements taxonomy list it as a subspecies of scarlet-banded barbet (Capito wallacei). The Cornell Lab of Ornithology's Birds of the World acknowledges that the "Sira" form is significantly different from the nominate and suggests that it be accorded species rank.

The bird's epithet commemorates John W. Fitzpatrick, an expert for the Peruan avifauna and director of the Cornell Lab of Ornithology.

== Description ==
The Sira barbet is approximately 19.5 to 20 cm (7.7 to 7.9 in) long and weighs 70 to 79 g (2.5 to 2.8 oz). The adult male's crown and nape are crimson. It has a band of white, fairly wide at the shoulders tapering to the tail; the rest of the upperparts are black. It has a broad white supercilium and a black "mask". The rest of its face, throat, neck, and upper chest are white. A broad crimson band crosses the chest and extends along the flanks where it meets a variable amount of black or gray. The rest of the underparts are white. The female's plumage has minor differences from the male's. The Sira barbet is distinguished from the scarlet-banded barbet by differences in morphology and plumage, particularly the color on the bird's flanks, lower back and thighs, and it has a wider, darker scarlet breast band. DNA sequencing was also used to confirm the Sira barbet's status as a distinct species.

== Distribution and habitat ==
The Sira barbet is found only on the eastern slope of the southern Cerros del Sira, Ucayali Department, Peru. Eight specimens were collected from the upper Río Shinipo 10°31′48″S 74°07′12″W and Río Tzipani valleys 10°41′24″S 74°05′56″W, and a further two at Quebrada Quirapokiari 10°25′12″S 74°09′00″W in July 2011. Its range is sympatric and syntopic with that of the gilded barbet, and coincides with the boundary and sections of the Sira Communal Reserve.

It primarily inhabits the highest stratum of tall (up to 30 m (98 ft)) montane forest with arboreal epiphytes and moss above a sparsely vegetated understory. It is also found in shorter forest with a thicker understory. In elevation it ranges as high as 1,700 m (5,600 ft) but is mostly found between 950 and 1,250 m (3,120 and 4,100 ft).

== Behavior ==
=== Feeding ===
The Sira barbet forages in the forest canopy and subcanopy. It was observed in pairs, small groups of the same species, and in mixed-species foraging flocks. It feeds primarily on fruits and takes small numbers of insects as well.

=== Breeding ===
No information has been published.

=== Vocalization ===
The Sira barbet has a low-pitched purred song. More commonly it emits a Tityra-like grunt. It also makes quiet low-pitched groans and clucks from roost cavities.

== Status ==
The IUCN has assessed the Sira barbet as Near Threatened. "This species has a very small known range, within which the population is thought to be small...[but] is not thought to be under any immediate threat".
