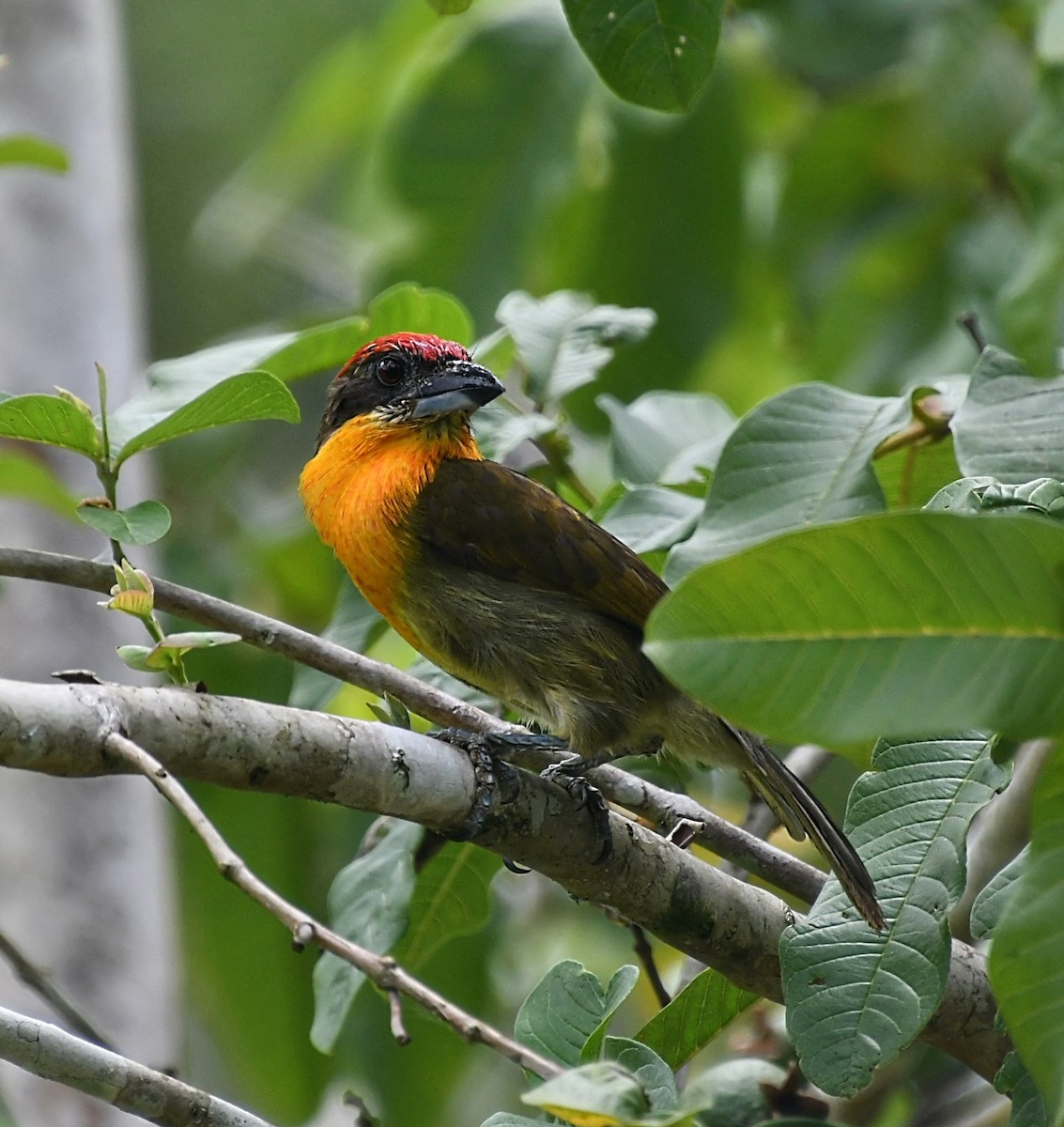

Conservation status
- Least Concern (IUCN 3.1)

Scientific classification
- Kingdom: Animalia
- Phylum: Chordata
- Class: Aves
- Order: Piciformes
- Family: Capitonidae
- Genus: Capito
- Species: C. aurovirens

Binomial name
- Capito aurovirens (Cuvier, 1829)

= Scarlet-crowned barbet =

Species of bird

The scarlet-crowned barbet (Capito aurovirens) is a species of bird in the family Capitonidae, the New World barbets. It is found in Amazonian Brazil, Colombia, Ecuador, and Peru.

== Taxonomy and systematics ==
The scarlet-crowned barbet is monotypic.

The New World barbets are more closely related to the toucan barbets (family Semnornithidae) and toucans (family Ramphastidae) than they are to the Asian and African barbets (families Megalaimidae and Lybiidae) despite all of the barbets' similar appearance.

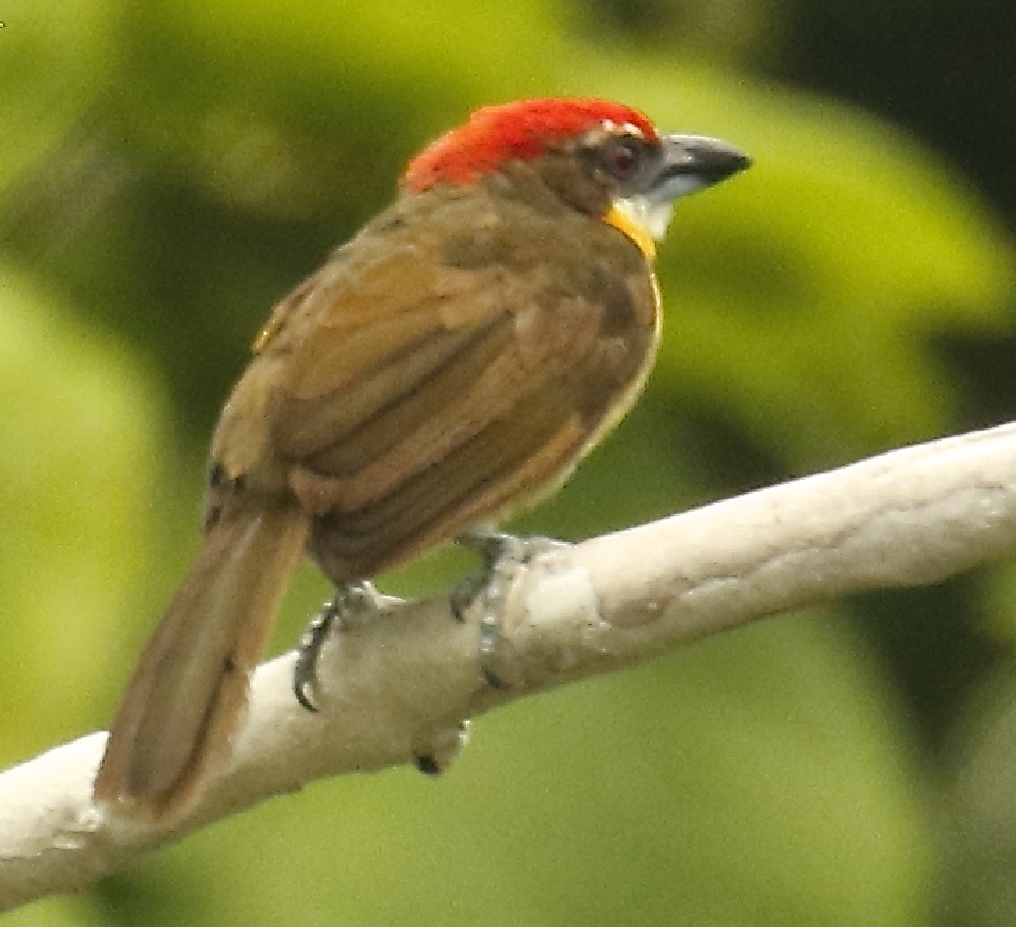
Napo River Island / Near Sacha Lodge - Ecuador

== Appearance ==
The scarlet-crowned barbet is approximately 19 cm (7.5 in) long and weighs 46 to 75 g (1.6 to 2.6 oz). Like all barbets, it is a chunky bird with a heavy bill. Both sexes are mostly olive green with a whitish chin and orange-yellow throat and upper breast. The male's red crown extends down the nape. Its underparts below the upper breast are olive, gray, and yellow. The female has a white crown that transitions to olive on the nape and is otherwise similar to the male. The immature is a grayer olive and has an olive crown with traces of red or white according to sex.

== Distribution and habitat ==
The scarlet-crowned barbet is found in the central Amazon Basin. In the west it extends from the Andean foothills of southern Colombia through eastern Ecuador to east-central Peru. East and south it reaches the Negro River in northwestern Brazil, the municipality of Tefé on the upper Amazon in central Brazil, and Acre in west-central Brazil. It inhabits progressively drier forest types from swamp through várzea and transitional to secondary forest. It tends to stay near water and uses all levels of the forest from the ground to the canopy. In elevation it ranges from the lowlands to only 500 to 600 m (1,600 to 2,000 ft) in the Andean foothills.

== Behavior ==
=== Feeding ===
Though the details of the scarlet-crowned barbet's diet are not known, it does eat berries, fruit, and insects. It gleans branches, twigs, live foliage, and clusters of dead leaves. It seldom joins mixed-species foraging flocks.

=== Breeding ===
The scarlet-crowned barbet breeds at almost any time of year in some part of its range, with the exception of September to November. Its nest has not been described though all members of the family nest in tree cavities that they excavate.

=== Vocalization ===
The scarlet-crowned barbet's song is "a series of low 'ttroup' or 'ttdoot' notes , and it countersings. Its calls are described as "grating-like" .

== Status ==
The IUCN has assessed the scarlet-crowned barbet as being of Least Concern. It is fairly common to common, occurs in several protected areas, and is adapted to shifting habitats.

== Gallery ==
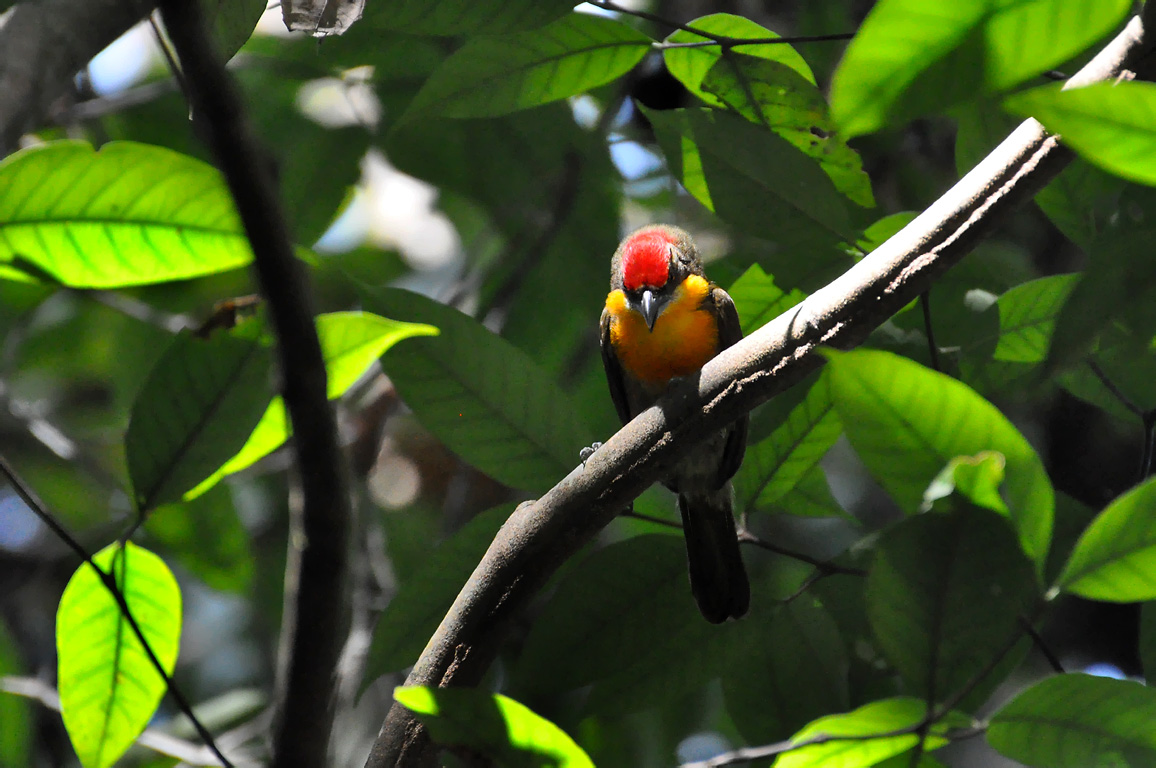
Capito aurovirens
