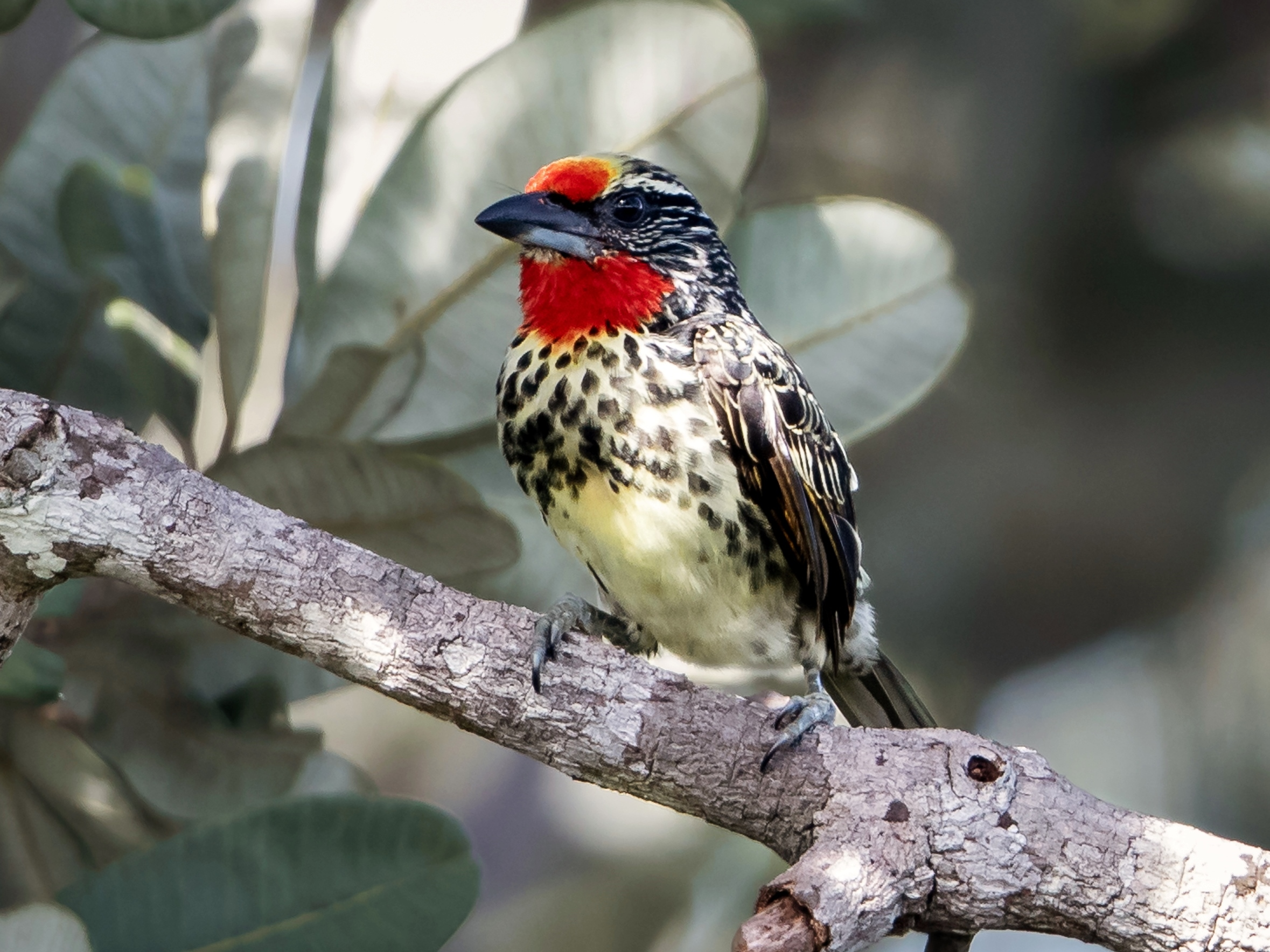
- female Black-spotted barbet (C. niger)

Scientific classification
- Kingdom: Animalia
- Phylum: Chordata
- Class: Aves
- Order: Piciformes
- Family: Capitonidae
- Genus: Capito; Vieillot, 1816

Type species
- "Tamatia à tête et gorge rouge" Buffon=Bucco niger Müller, PLS, 1776

Species
- 11, see text

= Capito =

Genus of birds

Capito is a genus of birds in the family Capitonidae. They are found in humid forests in South America, with a single species extending into eastern Panama. Slightly larger than the members of the genus Eubucco, members of the genus Capito are all sexually dimorphic and thickset, and have stubby pale bills that often are tipped black. With the exception of the somewhat aberrant scarlet-crowned barbet, black, red, orange, yellow and white are the dominating colours in their plumage, and males have at least partially black backs. Typically seen singly or in pairs, they are primarily frugivorous, but also take arthropods.

== Taxonomy ==
The genus Capito was introduced in 1816 by the French ornithologist Louis Vieillot to accommodate a single species, the "Tamatia à tête et gorge rouge" that had been described in 1780 by the French naturalist, the Comte de Buffon. This is the black-spotted barbet that had been assigned the binomial name Bucco niger by the German zoologist Philipp Statius Müller in 1776 and is the type species of the genus. The genus name is from Latin capito, capitonis meaning "big-headed".

== Species ==
The genus contains the following 11 species:

Image	Scientific name	Common name	Distribution
	Capito auratus	Gilded barbet	Bolivia, Brazil, Colombia, Ecuador, Peru, and Venezuela
	Capito aurovirens	Scarlet-crowned barbet	Brazil, Colombia, Ecuador, and Peru
	Capito brunneipectus	Brown-chested barbet	central Amazon Basin, eastern Amazonas–western Pará states, North Region, Brazil
	Capito dayi	Black-girdled barbet	Bolivia and Brazil.
	Capito hypoleucus	White-mantled barbet	Colombia
	Capito maculicoronatus	Spot-crowned barbet	Colombia and Panama
	Capito niger	Black-spotted barbet	northeastern South America, ranging as far south as the Amazon River and as far west as the Branco River
	Capito quinticolor	Five-colored barbet	western Colombia and far north-western Ecuador
	Capito squamatus	Orange-fronted barbet	western Ecuador and extreme southwestern Colombia
	Capito wallacei	Scarlet-banded barbet	south-western Loreto, Peru
	Capito fitzpatricki	Sira barbet	eastern Andes of Ucayali Department, Peru
