= Brown-chested barbet =

Conservation status
- Least Concern (IUCN 3.1)

Scientific classification
- Kingdom: Animalia
- Phylum: Chordata
- Class: Aves
- Order: Piciformes
- Family: Capitonidae
- Genus: Capito
- Species: C. brunneipectus

Binomial name
- Capito brunneipectus Chapman, 1921

Species of bird

The brown-chested barbet (Capito brunneipectus), also called cinnamon-breasted barbet, is a species of bird in the family Capitonidae, the New World barbets. It is endemic to Brazil's central Amazon Basin.

== Taxonomy and systematics ==
At one time, the brown-chested barbet, black-spotted barbet (Capito niger), and gilded barbet (Capito auratus) were considered conspecific but since the late 20th century have been accepted as individual species that are each other's closest relatives.

The brown-chested barbet is monotypic.

== Description ==
The brown-chested barbet is approximately 18 cm (7.1 in) long; the male weighs approximately 58 g (2.0 oz). The male's crown is dull gold with a wide black patch through the eye below it. Its back is black with yellow streaks. The throat is yellowish-white; below it is a cinnamon breastband and a yellow to olive belly, both with faint streaks. The female is similar but duller and it has more yellowish markings on the wings and its throat is black-spotted cinnamon.

== Distribution and habitat ==
The brown-chested barbet is found south of the Amazon River between the Madeira River on the west and the Tapajós River on the east. The southerly limit of its range is not known. It inhabits the canopy of wet forest.

== Behavior ==
=== Feeding ===
The brown-chested barbet is known to eat insects, other arthropods, and fruit. It forages by climbing vines and hopping on branches and twigs. It will join mixed-species foraging flocks.

=== Breeding ===
The brown-chested barbet apparently breeds from as early as March into June. No other information about its breeding phenology has been published.

=== Vocalization ===
The brown-chested barbet's song is "a rapid 'hoo' trill of short notes" .

== Status ==
The IUCN has assessed the brown-chested barbet as being of Least Concern. However, its "small range, coupled with the fact that so little is known about its habitat requirements and breeding habits, suggests that it should be monitored; its conservation status possibly requires reassessment."
