= Capitonides =

Capitonides Temporal range: Middle Miocene

Scientific classification
- Kingdom: Animalia
- Phylum: Chordata
- Class: Aves
- Order: Piciformes
- Family: Capitonidae
- Genus: †Capitonides; Ballmann, 1969
- Species: †C. europeus

Binomial name
- †Capitonides europeus Ballmann, 1969

Extinct genus of birds

Capitonides is an extinct New World barbet from the Middle Miocene of southern Germany. C. europaeus is the only species recorded for the genus. Carroll (1988) assigned the genus to family Capitonidae.
