= Three-toed woodpecker =

Three-toed woodpecker has been split into the following 2 species:

- American three-toed woodpecker
- Eurasian three-toed woodpecker
