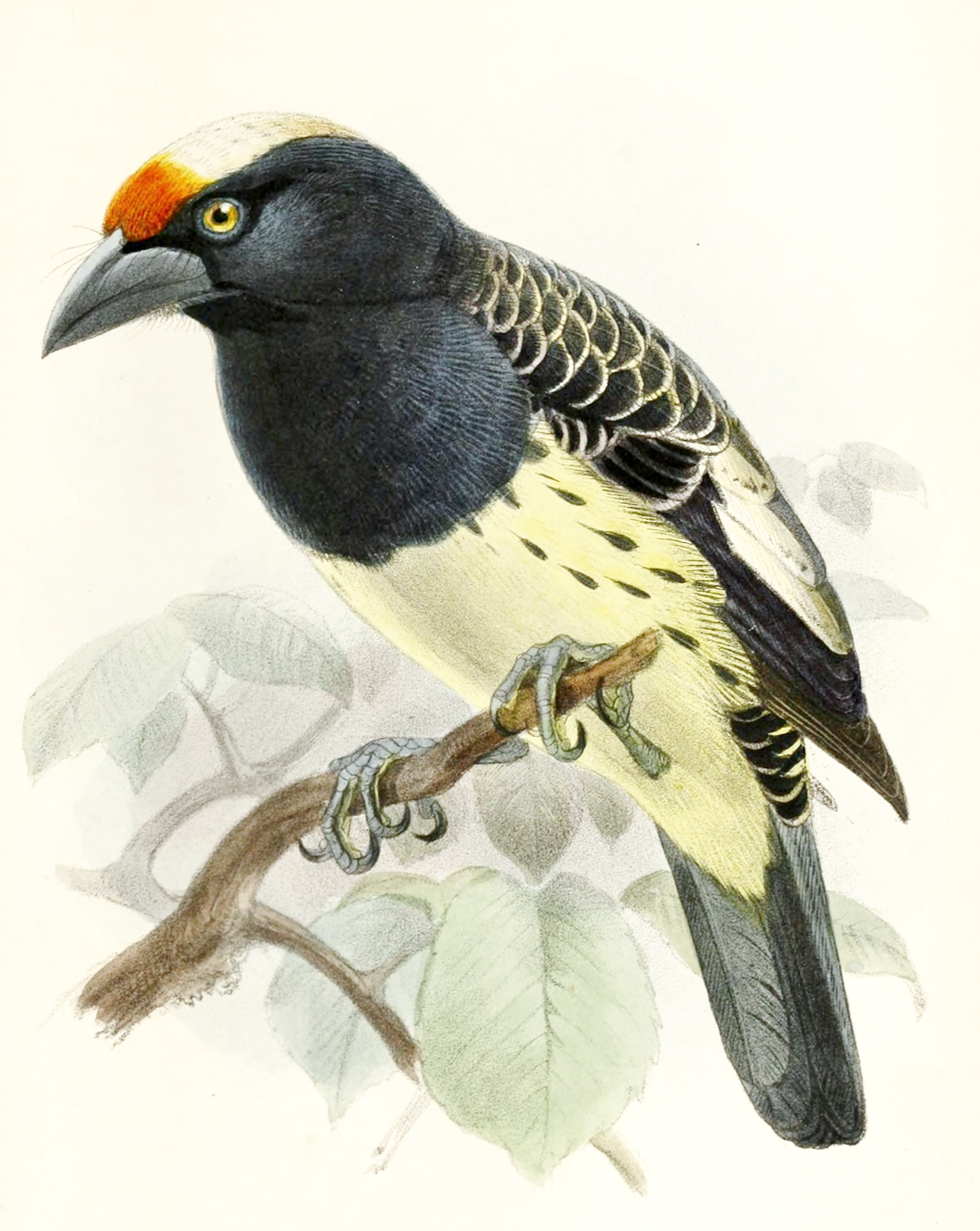

Conservation status
- Least Concern (IUCN 3.1)

Scientific classification
- Kingdom: Animalia
- Phylum: Chordata
- Class: Aves
- Order: Piciformes
- Family: Capitonidae
- Genus: Capito
- Species: C. squamatus

Binomial name
- Capito squamatus Salvin, 1876
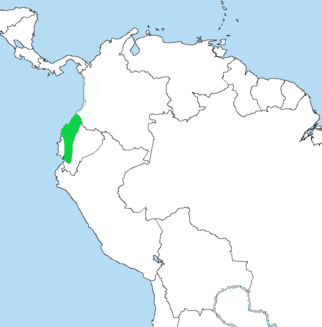

Audio
- A sound recording from Esmeraldas, Ecuador

= Orange-fronted barbet =

Species of bird

The orange-fronted barbet (Capito squamatus) is a species of bird in the family Capitonidae. It is found Ecuador and Colombia.

== Taxonomy and systematics ==
The orange-fronted barbet is monotypic. It and the spot-crowned barbet (Capito maculicoronatus) are sister species and may form a superspecies.

== Description ==
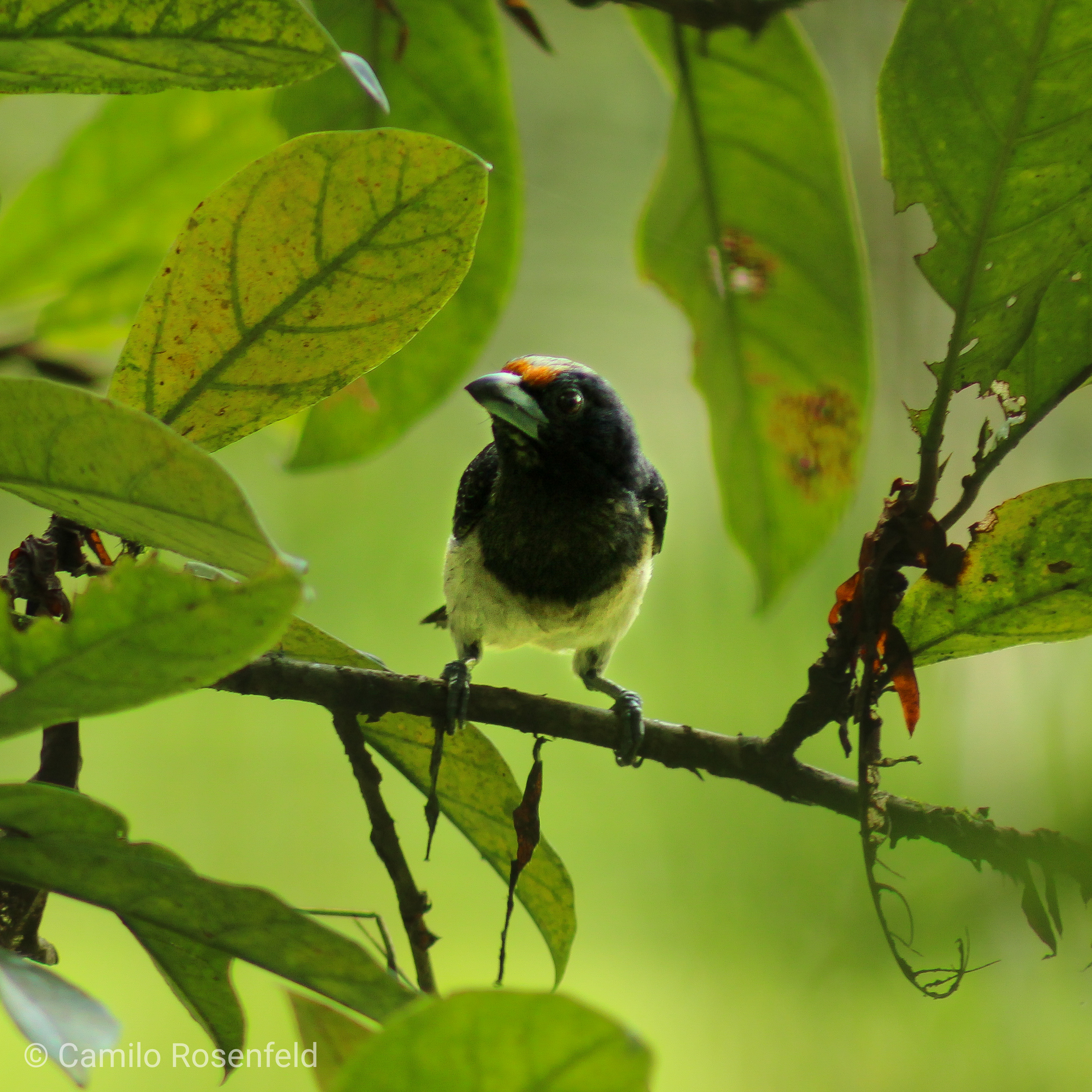
A female

The orange-fronted barbet is 16 to 18 cm (6.3 to 7.1 in) long and weighs 56 to 64 g (2.0 to 2.3 oz). The male has a white crown and an orange to red forecrown (the "front"). Its head except for the chin and its upperparts are black; white on some wing feathers remain visible when they are folded. Its underside from chin to the belly are yellowish white, sometimes with an orange tinge. Its flanks usually have light black spotting and the vent area is black. The female's front is yellow-orange; the rest of its head, its throat, and chest are black. Its black back has fine white markings on the wing-coverts.

== Distribution and habitat ==
The orange-fronted barbet is found from El Oro Province in southwestern Ecuador north into Nariño Department in extreme southwestern Colombia. There it inhabits wet lowlands and hill country, using primary and secondary forest and their edges as well as more open areas such as farms, orchards, and pastures with trees. In elevation it usually ranges from sea level to 800 m (2,600 ft) but can be found up to 1,500 m (4,900 ft) in some areas.

== Behavior ==
=== Feeding ===
The orange-fronted barbet usually forages in pairs, hunting all levels of the vegetation, and will join mixed-species foraging flocks. Its diet is primarily fruits and berries but also includes insects and spiders.

=== Breeding ===
The orange-fronted barbet nests between July and September and possibly earlier. Like all New World barbets, it excavates a nest hole in a tree; this species apparently sites the cavity several meters above ground. Almost no other information on its breeding phenology has been published.

=== Vocalization ===
The orange-fronted barbet's song is a "low-pitched, very fast, soft, purring trill" . Its call is a noisy "tyik" or "trrik" .

== Status ==
The IUCN has assessed the orange-fronted barbet as being of Least Concern. It has a very large range, and though its population is decreasing, it is estimated to number between 37,000 and 63,000.
