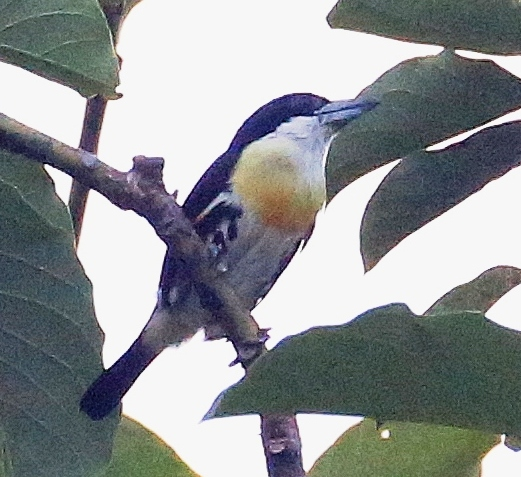

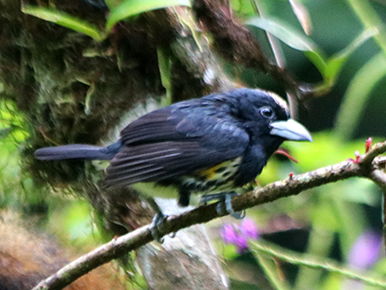
- Male and female

Conservation status
- Least Concern (IUCN 3.1)

Scientific classification
- Kingdom: Animalia
- Phylum: Chordata
- Class: Aves
- Order: Piciformes
- Family: Capitonidae
- Genus: Capito
- Species: C. maculicoronatus

Binomial name
- Capito maculicoronatus Lawrence, 1861
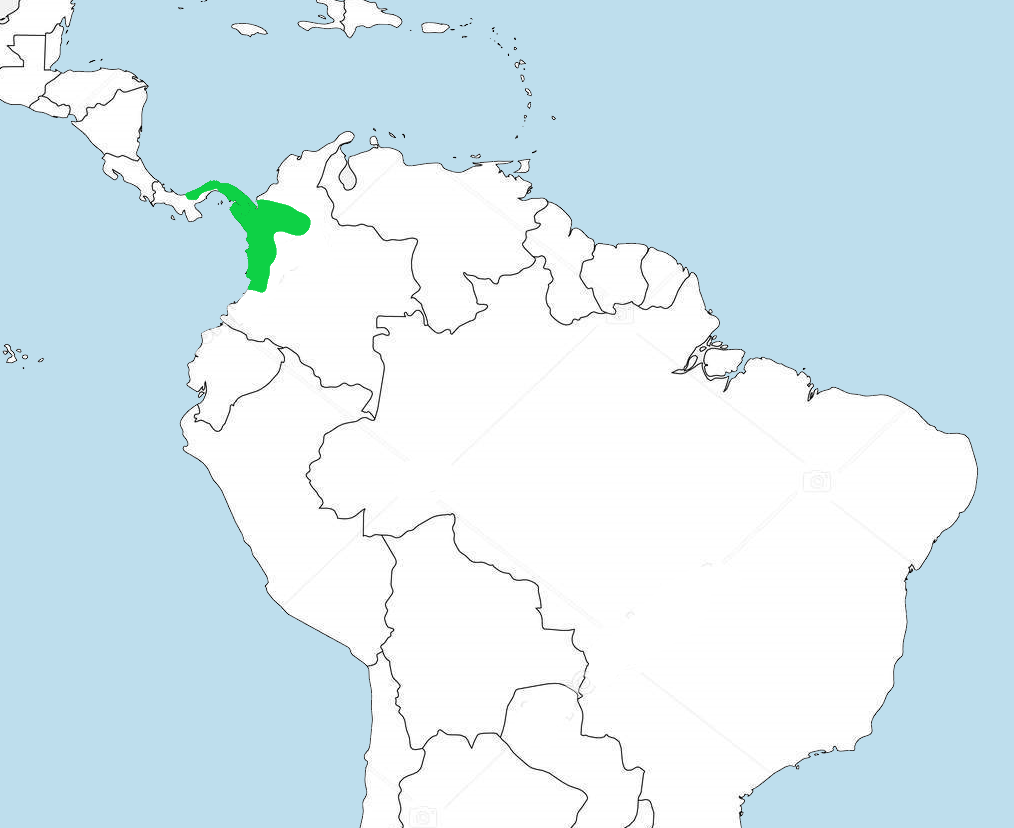

= Spot-crowned barbet =

Species of bird

The spot-crowned barbet (Capito maculicoronatus) is a species of bird in the family Capitonidae. It is found in Colombia and Panama.

== Taxonomy and systematics ==
The spot-crowned barbet has two recognized subspecies, the nominate Capito maculicoronatus maculicoronatus and C. m. rubrilateralis. Two additional subspecies, C. m. pirrensis and C. m. melas, have been proposed but "appear indistinguishable from rubrilateralis". The spot-crowned barbet and the orange-fronted barbet (C. squamatus) are sister species and may form a superspecies.

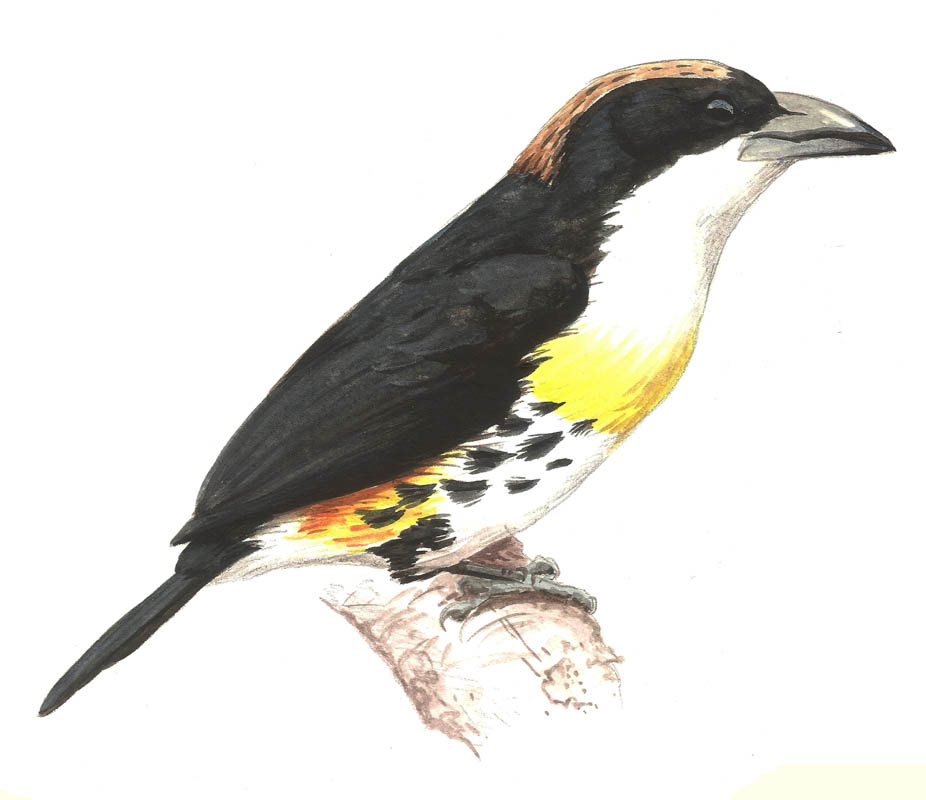
Illustration of male by Romain Risso

== Description ==
The spot-crowned barbet is 16 to 18 cm (6.3 to 7.1 in) long and weighs 44 to 66 g (1.6 to 2.3 oz). The nominate male is mostly black above with a crown having brown-white spots. Its throat is white, its upper breast yellow to orange, and the lower breast and belly white with black spots. It has a splash of yellow to orange on the flanks. The female differs by having a black throat and upper breast. C. m. rubrilateralis has more white on its crown and its flank mark is orange to red.

== Distribution and habitat ==
The nominate subspecies of spot-crowned barbet is found from Panama's Veraguas Province east to the Canal Zone. C. m. rubrilateralis is found from eastern Panama into Colombia, east to Antioquia Department and south to Valle Department. It usually inhabits wet primary forest in both lowands and hill country and is also found in secondary forest. It is mostly found at elevations between 600 and 900 m (2,000 and 3,000 ft) but up to 1,200 m (3,900 ft) in a few areas.

== Behavior ==
=== Feeding ===
The spot-crowned barbet forages from mid level to the forest canopy for fruits, berries, and insects. It occasionally forages in small groups, and up to 10 have been recorded in fruiting trees. It is known to follow army ant swarms.

=== Breeding ===
Observations of adult spot-crowned barbets in breeding condition, of nest excavation, and of fledglings appear to indicate a breeding season between December and late spring. One nest was attended by a male and two females.

=== Vocalization ===
The spot-crowned barbet's principal vocalization is " a series of harsh "kkaaak" notes, gradually shifting to "kkkaakkk" sounds; it has been described as both a song and a call .

== Status ==
The IUCN has assessed the spot-crowned barbet as being of Least Concern. It is uncommon to fairly common throughout its range.
