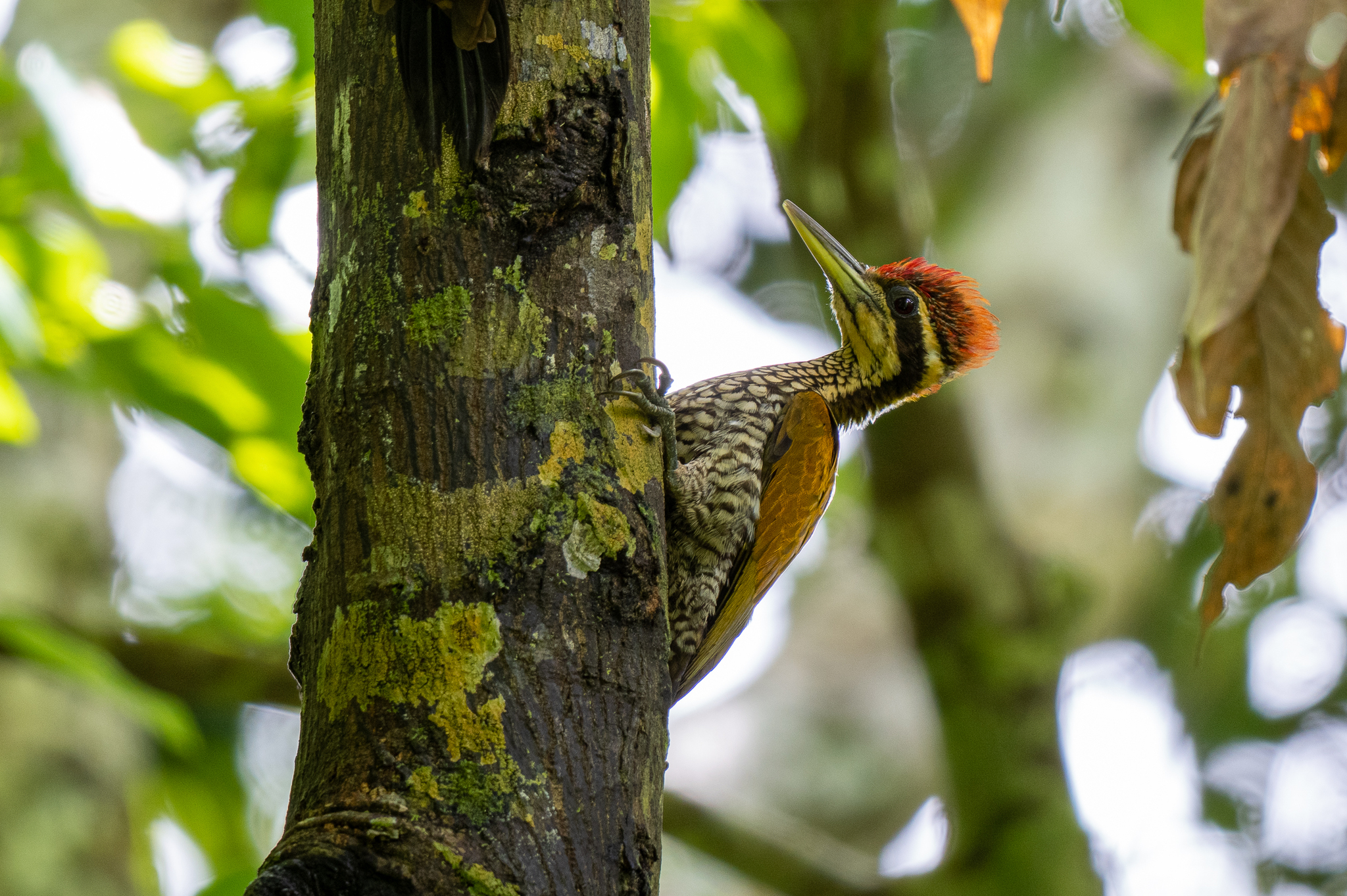

Conservation status
- Vulnerable (IUCN 3.1)

Scientific classification
- Kingdom: Animalia
- Phylum: Chordata
- Class: Aves
- Order: Piciformes
- Family: Picidae
- Genus: Chrysocolaptes
- Species: C. strictus

Binomial name
- Chrysocolaptes strictus (Horsfield, 1821)

= Javan flameback =

Species of bird

The Javan flameback (Chrysocolaptes strictus) is a species of bird in the family Picidae. It is found on Java, Bali and Kangean Islands. It is sometimes considered a subspecies of the greater flameback.
