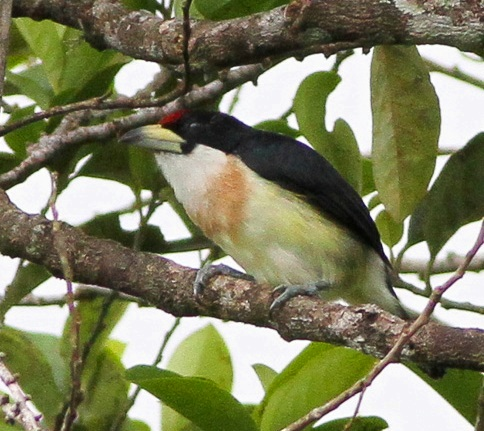

Conservation status
- Least Concern (IUCN 3.1)

Scientific classification
- Kingdom: Animalia
- Phylum: Chordata
- Class: Aves
- Order: Piciformes
- Family: Capitonidae
- Genus: Capito
- Species: C. hypoleucus

Binomial name
- Capito hypoleucus Salvin, 1897
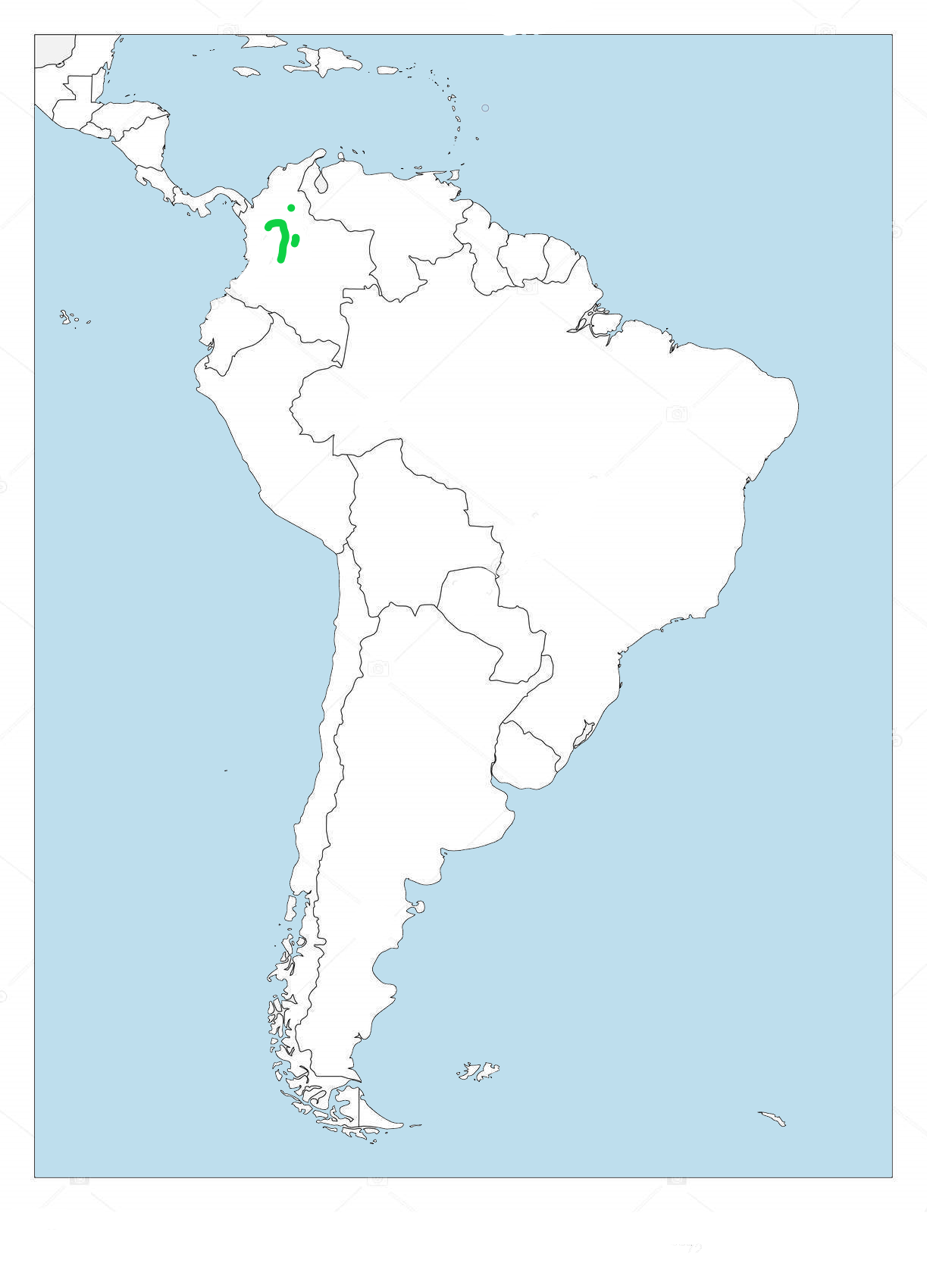

= White-mantled barbet =

Species of bird

The white-mantled barbet (Capito hypoleucus) is a species of bird in the family Capitonidae. It is endemic to Colombia.

Its natural habitats are tropical moist montane forests, pastureland, and plantations. It is threatened by habitat loss.

== Taxonomy ==
This species was first formally described in 1897 by English ornithologist Osbert Salvin, based on a sample collected by Antwerp Edgar Pratt in Antioquia Department. The species name is derived from the Latin capito - big-headed, and the Ancient Greek hupo - beneath, and leukos - white.

Three subspecies are recognized:

- C. h. hypoleucus - Bolivar to Antioquia (northwest Colombia)
- C. h. carrikeri - Antioquia (northwest Colombia)
- C. h. extinctus - Magdalena Valley (central Colombia)

== Description ==
With the division of toucan barbet, the white-mantled barbet is perhaps the largest of the New World barbets, rivaled only by the scarlet-banded barbet. with an average length of 19 cm (7.5 in), males and females respectively weigh an average of 74.6 g (2.63 oz) and 67.4 g (2.38 oz). The bird has black upperparts with narrow pale lines on the nape and scapulars. These lines are not easy to see because the bird is mostly observed higher up in the canopy of tall trees. The forehead and crown are red. The bird's underparts are white with a slight yellowish wash and a flush of cinnamon on the breast. They eyes are red, the large, chunky bill is yellowish, and the legs and feet are greenish-grey. Females have a black spot at the base of the lower mandible.

== Distribution and habitat ==
The white-mantled barbet is found in the Middle Magdalena Valley of Colombia at altitudes between 200 and 1,800 m (660 and 5,910 ft).

It is a bird of the tropical zone, inhabiting humid forests on montane slopes, forest patches with a mosaic of pastures, secondary forest, and plantations mixed with fruiting trees.

== Behaviour and ecology ==
These barbets typically forage in pairs or family groups, and may follow mixed-species feeding flocks. They mostly stay in the forest canopy, but come down and into the open at fruiting trees such as mango and Cecropia.

The white-mantled barbet population is declining, primarily due to habitat loss. The IUCN Red List classifies the species as vulnerable. The Red Book of the Birds of Colombia, noting that the species has lost 60% of its historic habitat and that that habitat continues to decrease, lists the bird as endangered. The primary causes of this habitat loss are illicit cultivation, overuse of insecticides, and small-scale gold mining.
