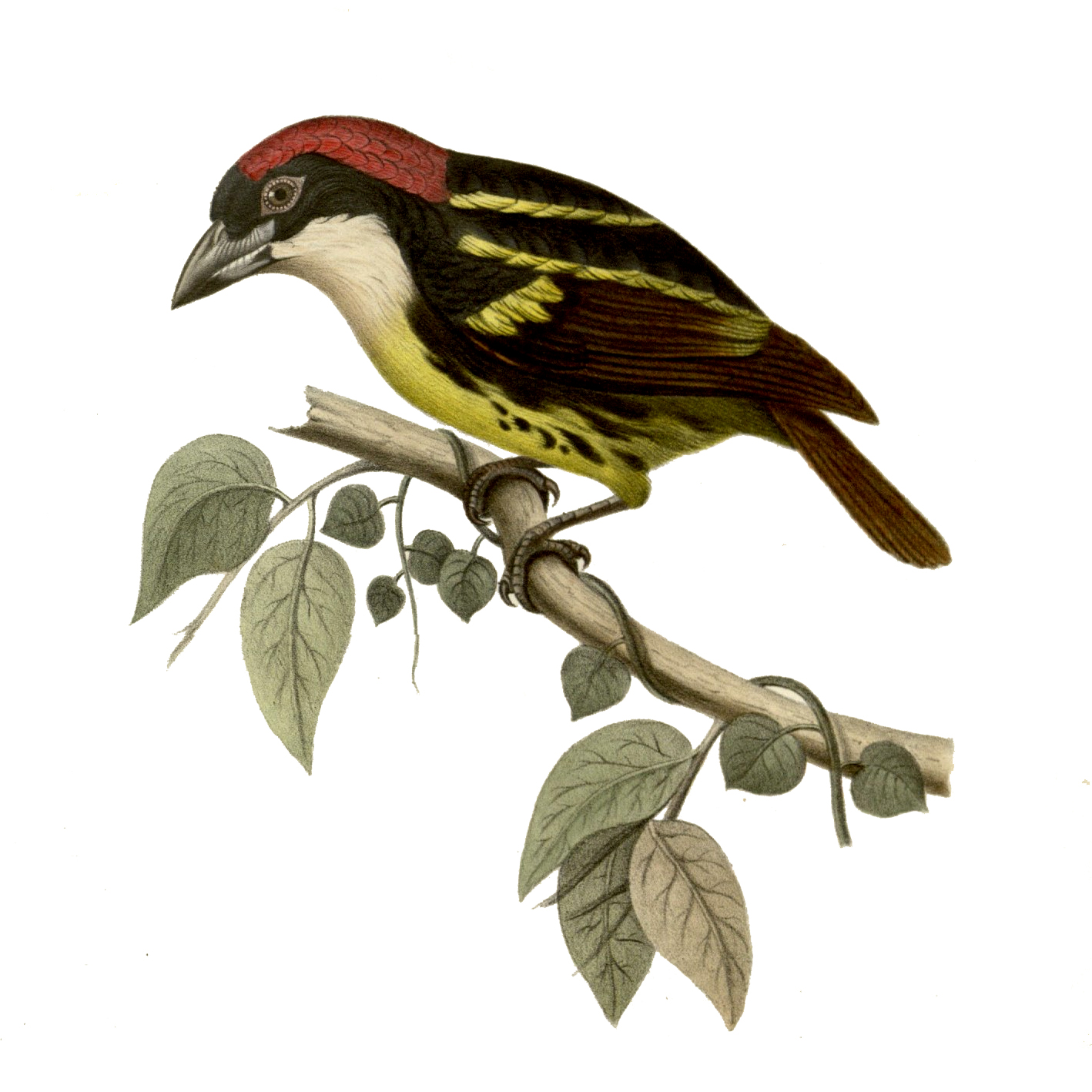
- male
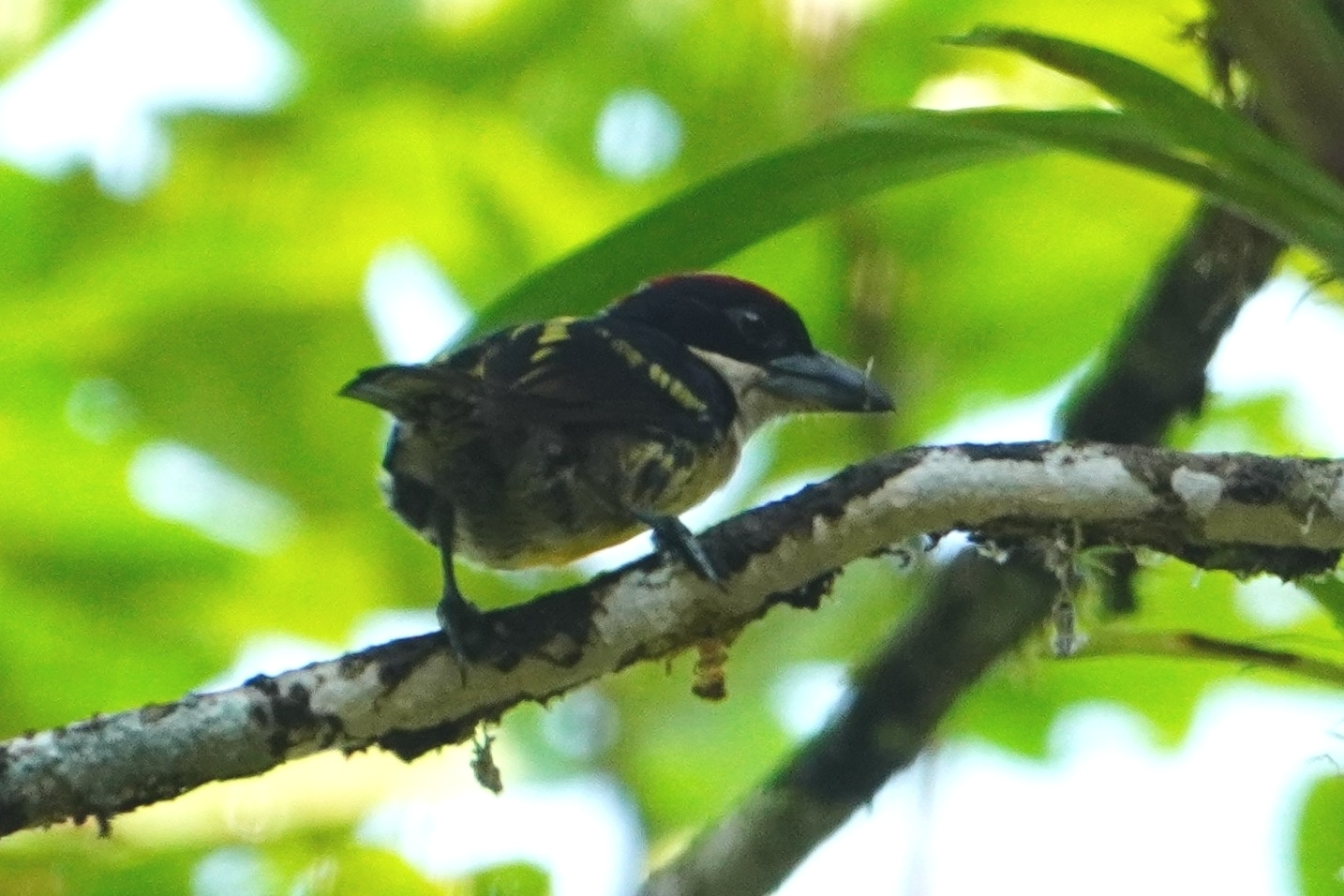

Conservation status
- Near Threatened (IUCN 3.1)

Scientific classification
- Kingdom: Animalia
- Phylum: Chordata
- Class: Aves
- Order: Piciformes
- Family: Capitonidae
- Genus: Capito
- Species: C. quinticolor

Binomial name
- Capito quinticolor Elliot, 1865
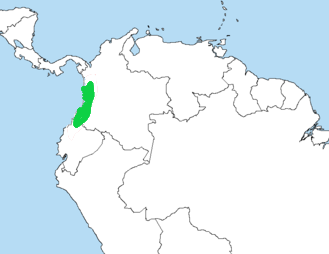

= Five-colored barbet =

Species of bird

The five-colored barbet (Capito quinticolor) is a species of bird in the family Capitonidae, the New World barbets. It is found in Colombia and Ecuador.

== Taxonomy and systematics ==
The five-colored barbet is monotypic. It and the white-mantled barbet (Capito hypoleucos) were briefly thought to be a single species. DNA data have shown it instead to be sister to black-girdled barbet (C. dayi).

== Description ==
The five-colored barbet is 17 to 18 cm (6.7 to 7.1 in) long and weighs 54 to 69 g (1.9 to 2.4 oz). The male is mostly black above with a yellow "V" on the mantle. It has a red crown and nape and yellow wingbars. Its throat and breast are yellow brightening to gold or orange on the belly; the flanks have black spots. The female is also black above but heavily streaked with gold. Its throat, breast, and belly are colored like the male's but have black spots throughout.

== Distribution and habitat ==
The five-colored barbet is found from central Chocó Department in western Colombia south into Ecuador's most northwesterly province, Esmeraldas. It inhabits wet primary and mature secondary forest and their edges and disturbed areas. In elevation it usually ranges from near sea level to 350 m (1,150 ft) but locally can be found up to approximately 600 m (2,000 ft).

== Behavior ==
=== Feeding ===
The five-colored barbet's diet is primarily fruit but it also takes insects. It forages from mid-level to the canopy in the forest interior; in the forest edges it also feeds in the understory. It sometimes joins mixed-species foraging flocks.

=== Breeding ===
The five-colored barbet's breeding phenology is practically unknown. Specimens in breeding condition suggest that its breeding season spans from April to July. A third adult has been observed accompanying apparently mated pairs.

=== Vocalization ===
The five-colored barbet's song is a "low-pitched, hollow, hoop trill" ; both sexes sing. It also has a "guttural 'churr' call" .

== Status ==
The IUCN has assessed the five-colored barbet as Near Threatened; between 2009 and 2020 it was rated as the more severe Vulnerable. "[Its] population is thought to be small and suspected to be in decline due to the loss and degradation of habitat."
