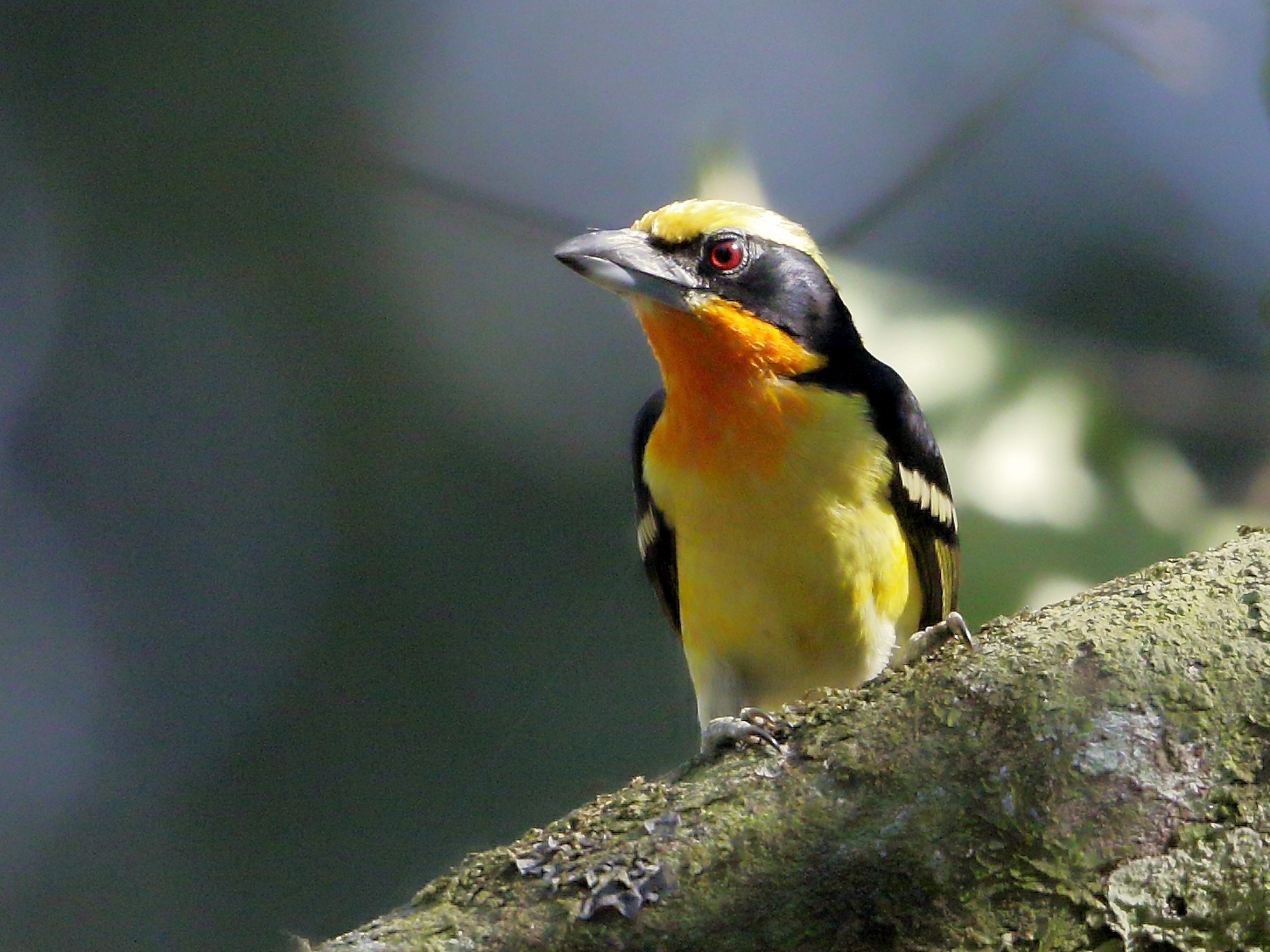

Conservation status
- Least Concern (IUCN 3.1)

Scientific classification
- Kingdom: Animalia
- Phylum: Chordata
- Class: Aves
- Order: Piciformes
- Family: Capitonidae
- Genus: Capito
- Species: C. auratus

Binomial name
- Capito auratus (Dumont, 1805)
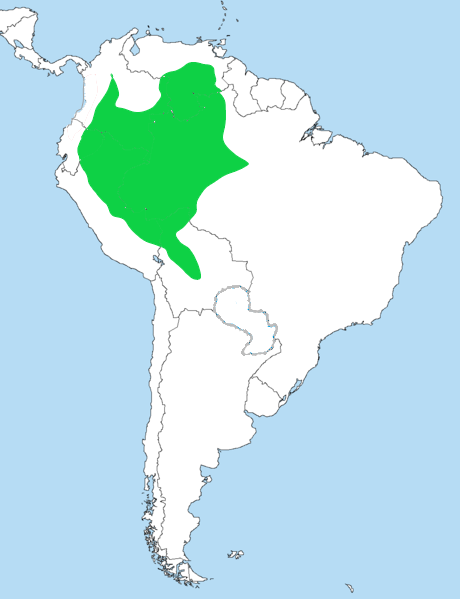

= Gilded barbet =

Species of bird

The gilded barbet (Capito auratus) is a species of bird in the family Capitonidae, the New World barbets, and a close relative of the toucans.

== Description ==
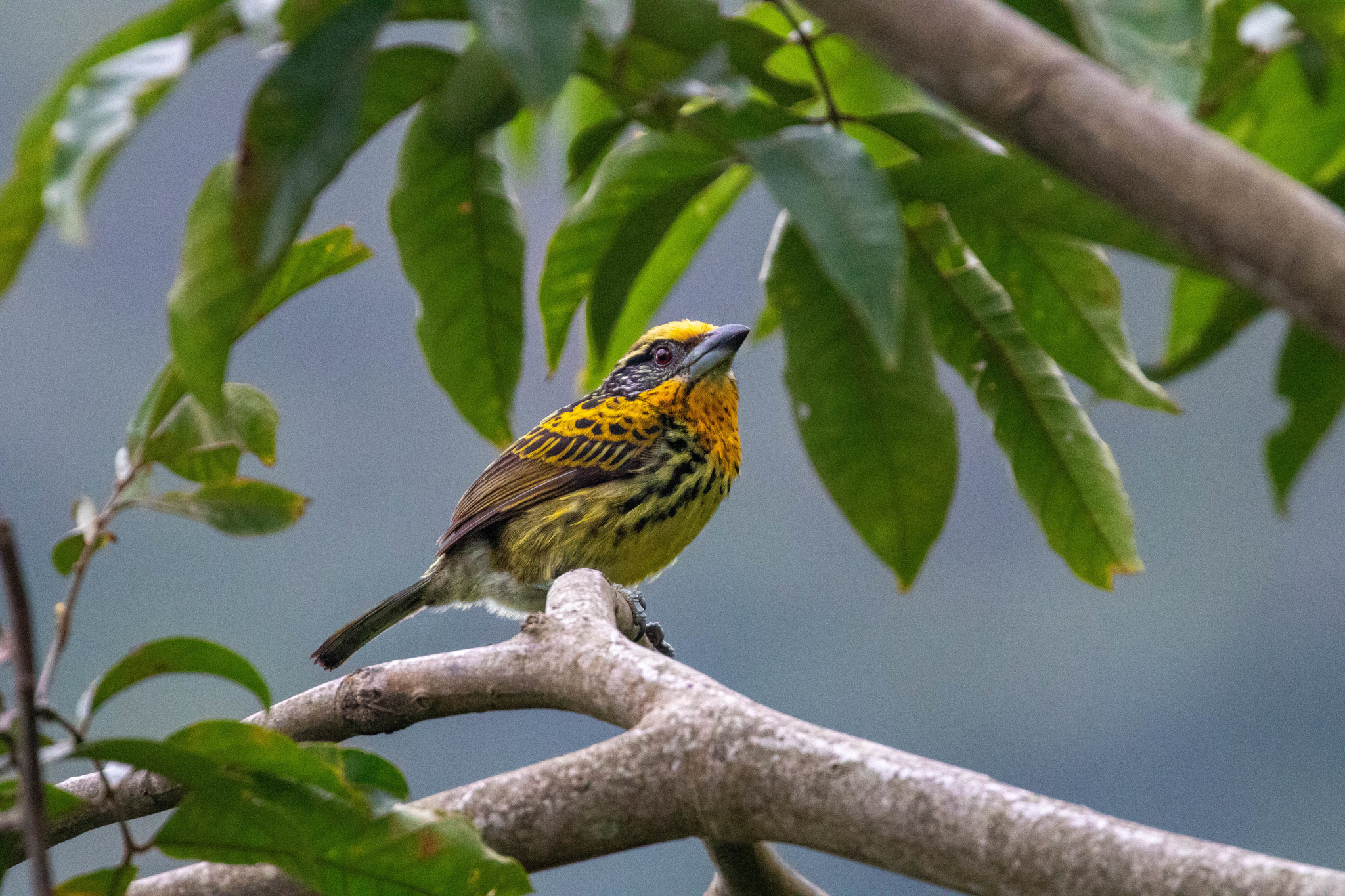
Female bird

It has an average length of c. 17,5 cm. Like other New World barbets, the gilded barbet is a thickset, relatively large-headed bird with a stubby bill. The upperparts, tail, wings, and mask are mainly black. The spotty bar over the greater wing coverts, narrow edging to the remiges, and tips to the tertials are yellow. Additionally, the narrow yellow eyebrows extend as two parallel lines over the mantle. The belly is mainly pale yellow with black streaking on the flanks. Depending on the subspecies, the throat ranges from red to orange, and the crown ranges from deep yellow to brownish-orange to reddish-orange. The female resembles the male but has extensive orange-yellow edging on the wing-coverts, yellowish streaking on the auriculars and back, and black streaking on the flanks that also extends over the chest. In females from the westernmost part of its range (subspecies punctatus), the throat is streaked black. Both sexes have dark maroon irides, greyish legs, and a broadly black-tipped grey bill.

== Distribution and habitat ==
It is found in Bolivia, Brazil, Colombia, Ecuador, Peru, and Venezuela, in the Orinoco River Basin and western Amazon Basin. It was formerly considered a subspecies of the black-spotted barbet from north-eastern South America. Its natural habitats are tropical moist lowland forests and woodland. It mainly occurs in lowlands, but also ranges into the lower foothills of the eastern Andes. It is largely frugivorous.

=== Western Amazon Basin and Orinoco range ===
The gilded barbet ranges in the eastern Andes drainages to the rivers of the western Amazon Basin from eastern Colombia-Venezuela, eastern Ecuador, north to southeastern Peru, and northern Bolivia; in Bolivia, the barbet only ranges on the headwater tributaries to the northeasterly flowing Madeira River. The eastern limit in the south-west Amazon Basin is the Purus River west of the Madeira.

In the north-west Amazon Basin, the eastern range limit is central Roraima state Brazil, the south flowing Branco River. The contiguous range to the north-west into Venezuela is all of eastern Venezuela approaching the Guyana border. The gilded barbet's range is on the eastern side of the Caribbean north-flowing Orinoco River drainage, but avoids the lower-half riverine strip by 150 km; the range occurs on the upper-half of the Orinoco River extending south into the eastern border area of Colombia.

A small range extension goes southeastwards into central Bolivia, which are also tributary areas to the Madeira River.
