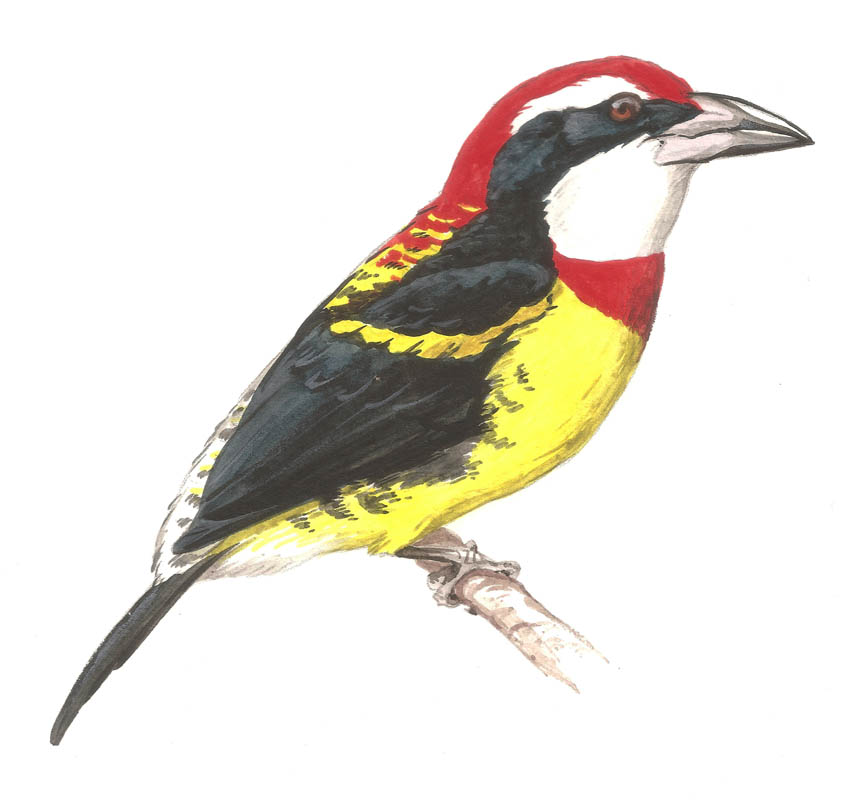

Conservation status
- Vulnerable (IUCN 3.1)

Scientific classification
- Kingdom: Animalia
- Phylum: Chordata
- Class: Aves
- Order: Piciformes
- Family: Capitonidae
- Genus: Capito
- Species: C. wallacei

Binomial name
- Capito wallacei O'Neill, Lane, Kratter, Capparella & Fox Joo, 2000

Synonyms
- Scarlet-belted barbet

= Scarlet-banded barbet =

Species of bird

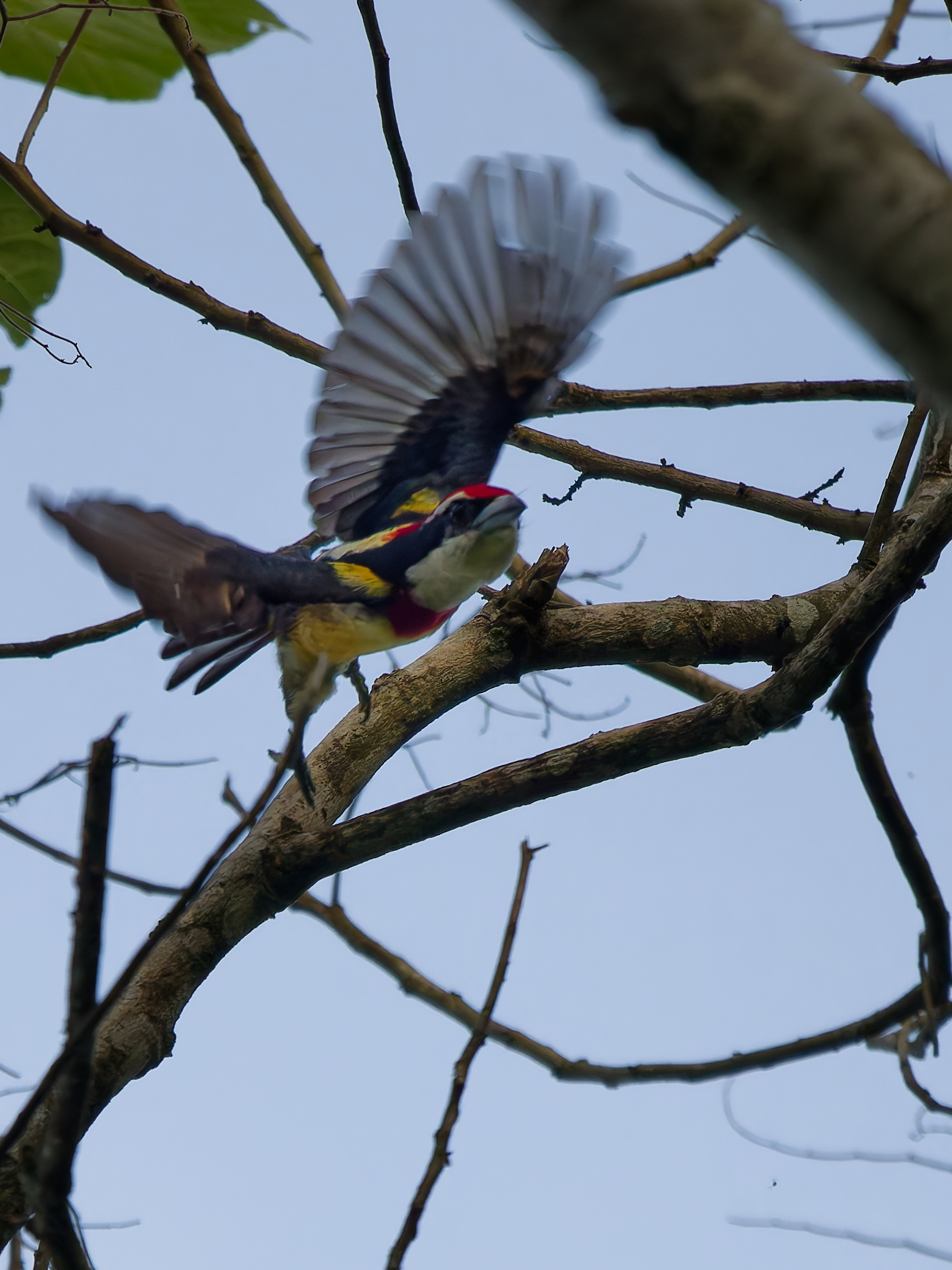
Scarlet-banded Barbet

The scarlet-banded barbet (Capito wallacei) is a species of bird in the New World barbet family, Capitonidae. It is endemic to Peru.

== Taxonomy and systematics ==
The scarlet-belted barbet was discovered in 1996 and formally described in 2000. According to the International Ornithological Committee (IOC), the species is monotypic. However, the South American Classification Committee of the American Ornithological Society (AOS) and the Clements taxonomy consider the Sira barbet (Capito fitzpatricki) as a subspecies of scarlet-banded barbet. The Cornell Lab of Ornithology's Birds of the World acknowledges that Sira barbet is significantly different from the nominate and suggests that it be accorded species rank.

== Description ==
The scarlet-banded barbet is 19.5 cm (7.7 in) long and weighs 65 to 78 g (2.3 to 2.8 oz). A strikingly colored species, its cap and nape are scarlet, while a broad white supercilium separates the crown from the black ear coverts. Most of the upperparts are black except for a yellow mid-back and large white rump patch. Below, the throat and upper breast are white, bordered below by a broad scarlet band, while the rest of the underparts are shades of yellow.

== Distribution and habitat ==
The scarlet-banded barbet has been found only on a ridgetop known as Peak 1538 in the remote Cordillera Azul National Park in south-western Loreto, Peru. (It was mistakenly listed as being in Ucayali, Peru, in its formal description.) There it inhabits humid, mossy, sub-montane and montane forest at elevations between 1,350 and 1,500 m (4,430 and 4,920 ft).

== Behavior ==
=== Feeding ===
The scarlet-banded barbet forages in the forest canopy. It was observed in small groups of the same species and in mixed-species foraging flocks. It feeds on fruits and seeds and probably takes insects as well.

=== Breeding ===
The scarlet-banded barbet specimens collected during the 1996 expedition indicate that the nesting season is probably March through May. No other information about its breeding habits has been published.

=== Vocalization ===
The scarlet-banded barbet's song is " a fast, low-pitched trill...'tdddddd-'" that sounds like a woodpecker's drumming. Its call is a "guttural 'ggrrrakk'" .

== Status ==
The IUCN has assessed the scarlet-banded barbet as Vulnerable. While it appears to be fairly common within its range, this range is small (1,944 square kilometres (751 sq mi)) and the total population is estimated to be between 250 - 999 mature individuals as of 2023.

== Additional reading ==
- Schulenberg, T.; Stotz, D.; Lane, D.; O'Neill, J.; Parker III, T. (2007). Birds of Peru. Christopher Helm Publishers. ISBN 978-0-7136-8673-9.
