= Philipp Ludwig Statius Müller =

German zoologist (1725–1776)

- Born: 25 April 1725; Esens, Lower Saxony, Germany
- Died: 5 January 1776 (aged 50); Erlangen, Germany
- Known for: German translation of Linnaeus's Natursystem; scientific classification for a number of various species
- Scientific career
- Fields: Zoology, entomology
- Institutions: Erlangen, Germany
- Author abbrev. (zoology): Statius Müller or P.L.S. Müller

Philipp Ludwig Statius Müller (25 April 1725 – 5 January 1776) was a German zoologist.

Statius Müller was born in Esens, and was a professor of natural science at Erlangen. Between 1773 and 1776, he published a German translation of Linnaeus's Natursystem. The supplement in 1776 contained the first scientific classification for a number of species, including the dugong, guanaco, potto, tricolored heron, umbrella cockatoo, red-vented cockatoo, and the enigmatic hoatzin. He was also an entomologist.

Müller died in Erlangen.

== Works ==
- Statius Müller, P. L. 1776. Des Ritters Carl von Linné Königlich Schwedischen Leibarztes &c. &c. vollständigen Natursystems Supplements- und Register-Band über alle sechs Theile oder Classen des Thierreichs. Mit einer ausführlichen Erklärung. Nebst drey Kupfertafeln.Nürnberg. (Raspe).
