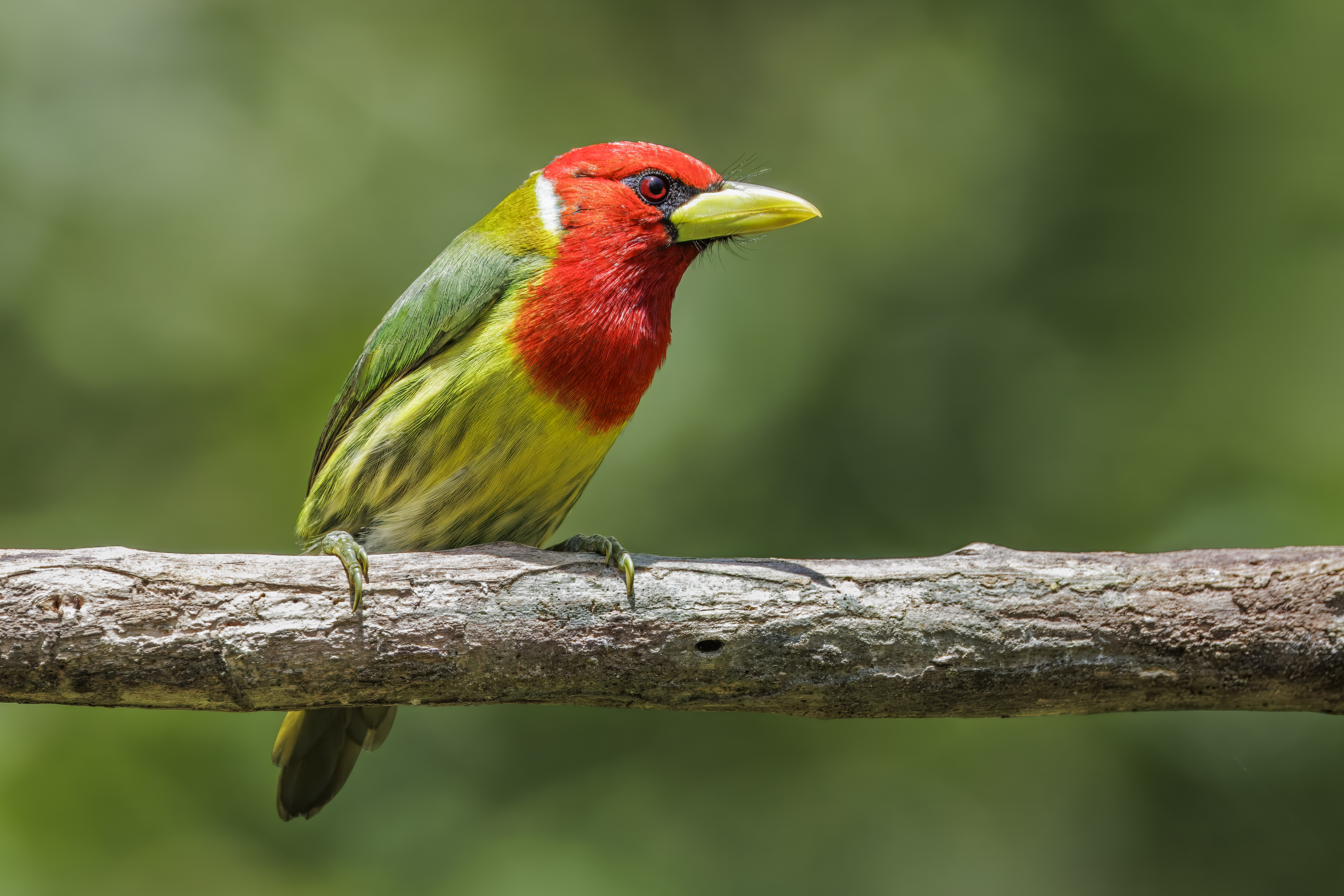
- male red-headed barbet (Eubucco bourcierii) in Ecuador

Scientific classification
- Kingdom: Animalia
- Phylum: Chordata
- Class: Aves
- Order: Piciformes
- Suborder: Pici
- Infraorder: Ramphastides
- Family: Capitonidae; Bonaparte, 1838

Genera
- †Capitonides; Capito; Eubucco

= New World barbet =

New World barbets

Near passerine birds from the family Capitonidae of the order Piciformes

The New World barbets are a family, Capitonidae, of 15 birds in the order Piciformes, which inhabit humid forests in Central and South America. They are closely related to the toucans.

The New World barbets are plump birds, with short necks and large heads. They get their name from the bristles that fringe their heavy bills. Most species are brightly coloured and live in tropical forest.

These barbets are mostly arboreal birds, which nest in tree holes dug by breeding pairs, laying two to four eggs. They eat fruit and insects. These birds do not migrate.

== Taxonomy ==
Fossil New World barbets have been found dating from the Miocene in Florida. The closest relatives of the barbets are the toucans, and these two families are also closely related to the honeyguides and woodpeckers (with which they form the order Piciformes).

Formerly, the barbets have been treated as one family. This has turned out to be paraphyletic, though, with regard to toucans; thus, only the New World true barbets are retained in the Capitonidae. The African barbets (Lybiidae) and the Asian barbets (Megalaimidae), as well as the two toucan-barbets from the Americas (Semnornithidae) are currently split from this family. Alternatively, the toucans, which evolved from a common ancestor shared with the American barbets, might be included in the traditional all-encompassing barbet family. As they have evolved characteristics that are unique to themselves, they are usually treated separately, thus the barbets are split up according to the four lineages.

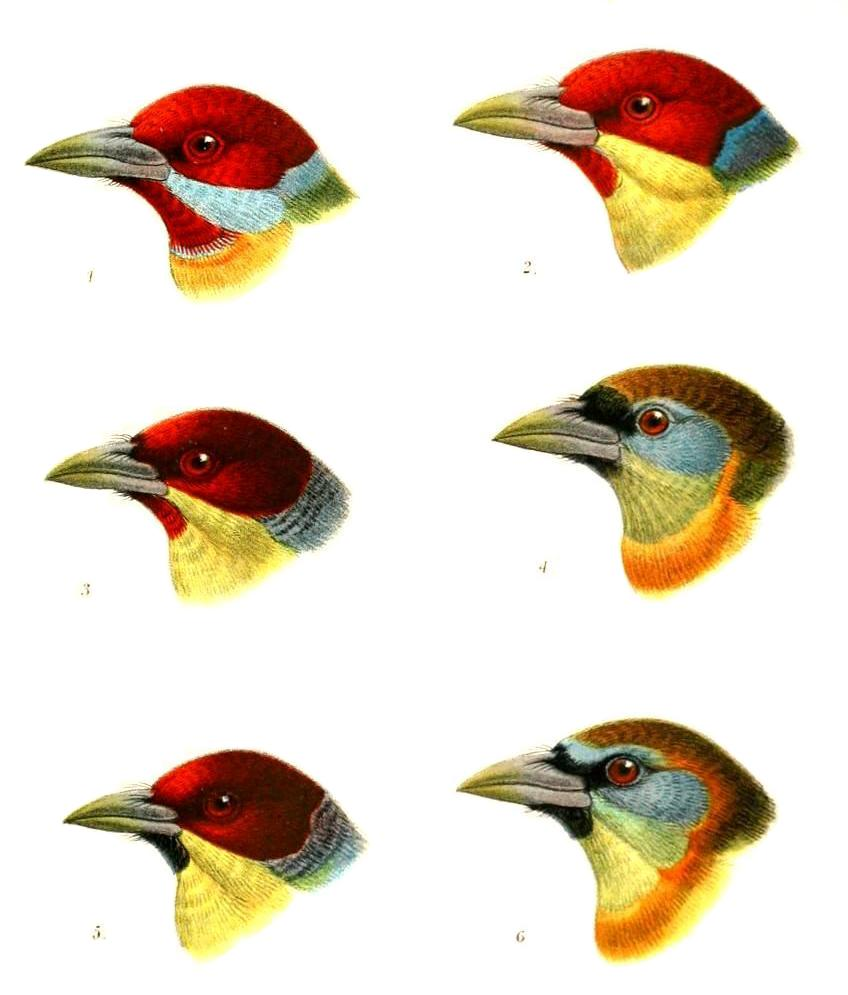
Head patterns of three species, constituting five races: 1. & 2. Eubucco versicolor, ♂♂; 3. & 5. Eubucco richardsoni, ♂♂; 4. & 6. Eubucco bourcierii, ♀♀; – by Keulemans, 1891

The phylogenetic relationship between the New World barbets and the eight other families in the order Piciformes is shown in the cladogram below. The number of species in each family is taken from the list maintained by Frank Gill, Pamela C. Rasmussen and David Donsker on behalf of the International Ornithological Committee (IOC).

- Piciformes
  - - Galbulidae – jacamars (18 species)
    - Bucconidae – puffbirds (38 species)
  - - - Indicatoridae – honeyguides (16 species)
      - Picidae – woodpeckers (240 species)
    - - Megalaimidae – Asian barbets (35 species)
      - - Lybiidae – African barbets (42 species)
        - - Capitonidae – New World barbets (15 species)
          - - Semnornithidae – toucan barbets (2 species)
            - Ramphastidae – toucans (43 species)

=== Fossils ===
- Genus Capitonides (Early – Middle Miocene of Europe) (fossil)
  - †Capitonides europeus

== Ecology ==
While most New World barbet species inhabit lowland forest, some range into montane and temperate forests, as well. Most are restricted to habitats containing trees with dead wood, which are used for nesting.

The diet of barbets is mixed, with fruit being the dominant part. Small prey items are also taken, especially when nesting. Barbets are capable of shifting their diet quickly in the face of changing food availability. Numerous species of fruiting trees and bushes are visited; an individual barbet may feed on as many as 60 different species in its range. They also visit plantations and take cultivated fruit and vegetables. Fruit is eaten whole, and indigestible material such as seed pits is regurgitated later (often before singing). Regurgitation does not usually happen in the nest (as happens with toucans). Like their relatives, New World barbets are thought to be important agents in seed dispersal in tropical forests.

As well as taking fruit, they also take arthropod prey, gleaned from the branches and trunks of trees. A wide range of insects is taken, including ants, beetles, and moths. Scorpions and centipedes are also taken, and a few species take small vertebrates such as frogs.

== Relationship with people ==
New World barbets have little direct impact on humans. The loss of forest can have a deleterious effect on barbet species dependent on old growth, to the benefit of species that favor more disturbed or open habitat.

Three species of New World barbets are listed as threatened by the IUCN: The white-mantled barbet of Colombia is listed as endangered and the five-coloured barbet as vulnerable, the two having a relatively small range threatened by deforestation for the timber industry and to create space for agriculture (including coca and marijuana) and livestock, and mining. The quite recently discovered scarlet-banded barbet of Peru is considered vulnerable due to its small population size (estimated at under 1000 birds), although its remote habitat is not immediately threatened.
