= List of Eurasian nuthatch subspecies =

The Eurasian nuthatch (Sitta europaea) is a small passerine bird found throughout temperate Asia and in Europe. There are more than 20 subspecies, but the precise number depends on how small differences between populations are evaluated. This article follows the 2013 Handbook of the Birds of the World Alive treatment, which has more recognised forms than the 1996 Tits, Nuthatches and Treecreepers. Given the similarities between geographical forms of the Eurasian nuthatch, subspecies boundaries are somewhat fluid, although fewer than half as many are recognised now as in 1967.

The Eurasian nuthatch taxa can be divided into three main groups; the S. e. caesia group of Europe, North Africa and the Middle East, the S. e. europaea group of Scandinavia, Russia, Japan and northern China and the S. e. sinensis group of southern and eastern China and Taiwan. These may have been geographically isolated from each other until relatively recently. Birds of intermediate appearance occur where the group ranges overlap. The descriptions below are of the male. The female is usually slightly duller with a brown tint to the eyestripe and paler underparts, although the sexes are very similar in the S. e. sinensis group.

The 2025 edition of Cornell Birds of the World calls the S. e. caesia group Western and the S. e. sinensis group Chinese. It splits the S. e. europaea group into White-bellied for the first six subspecies listed below and Buff-bellied for the other seven.

== S. e. caesia group ==
The S. e. caesia group is found in much of Europe, as well as North Africa and the Middle East. Members of the subspecies group have a buff breast and a white throat.

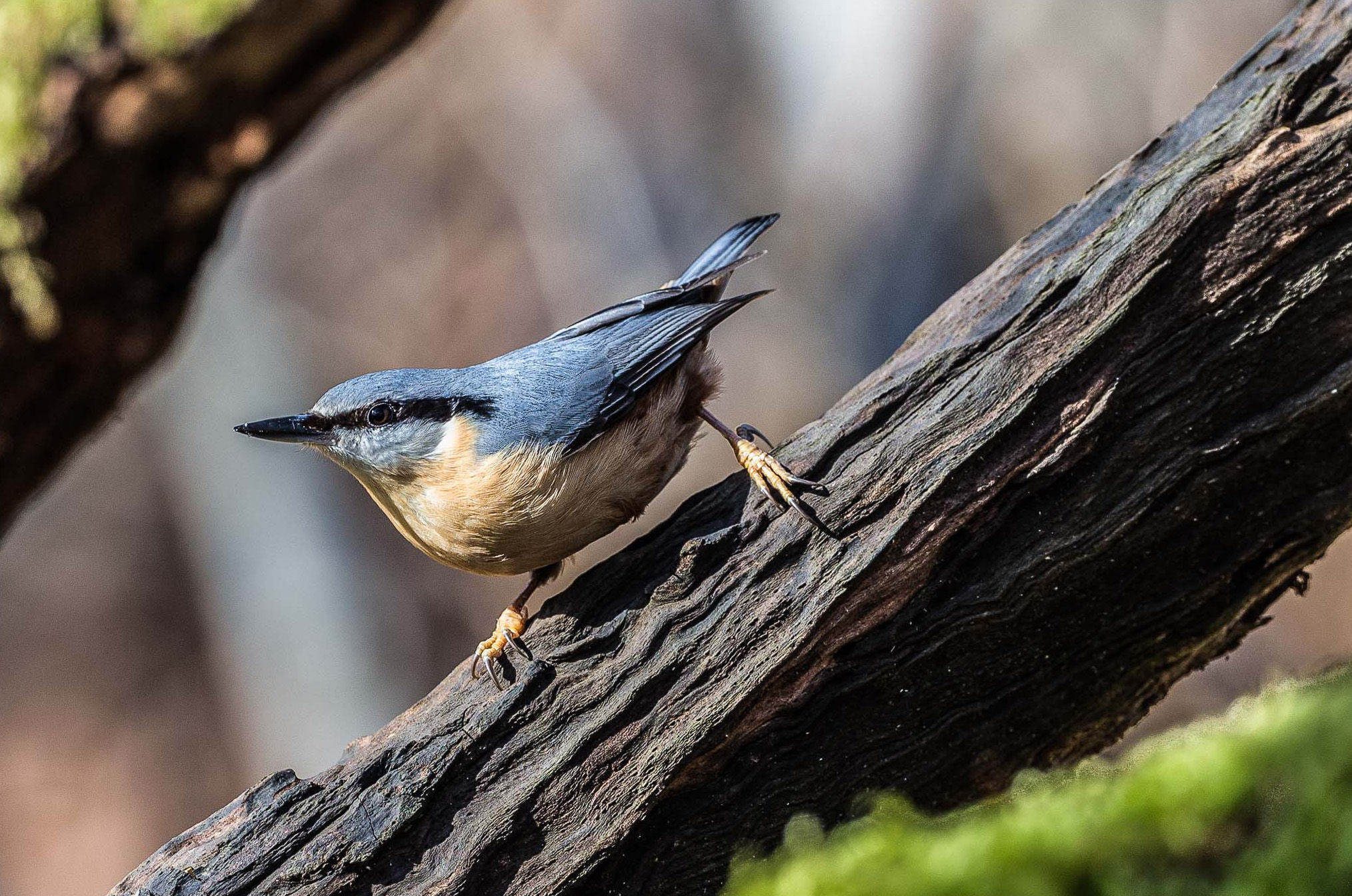
S. e. caesia (United Kingdom), part of the eponymous group of subspecies

Subspecies listed geographically
Subspecies	Authority	Range	Description
S. e. caesia	Wolf, 1810	Much of Western Europe south to northern Spain, the Alps, Greece and western Turkey, north to Denmark, and east to the western regions of Poland, Romania and Bulgaria.	Upperparts blue grey, black eye-stripe, white throat. Rest of underparts orange-buff, becoming brick red at rear and on flanks. White markings on undertail.
S. e. hispaniensis	Witherby, 1913	Central and southern Spain, Portugal and northern Morocco	Like S. e. caesia, but underparts paler pink-buff
S. e. cisalpina	Sachtleben, 1919	Southernmost Switzerland, Italy including Sicily, southern Croatia and southwest Montenegro	Like S. e. caesia, but underparts brighter and more orange-tinted, bill shorter and more pointed
S. e. levantina	Hartert, 1905	Southern Turkey	Like S. e. hispaniensis but underparts more pink and less buff, pale flanks, slightly paler grey upperparts
S. e. persica	Witherby, 1903	Southeast Turkey, northern Iraq and western Iran	Small, paler grey upperparts, white forehead and supercilium, creamy underparts, bill short and thin
S. e. caucasica	Reichenow, 1901	Northeast Turkey, southwest Russia, Georgia, Armenia and Azerbaijan	Small, dark grey upperparts, forehead often whitish, underparts bright orange-buff
S. e. rubiginosa	Tschusi & Zarudny, 1905	South Caucasus and northern Iran	Like S. e. caucasica but upperparts darker, underparts paler, usually lacks white forehead

== S. e. europaea group ==
The S. e. europaea group is found in Scandinavia and Russia, through to Japan and northern China. Members of the group have a white breast.

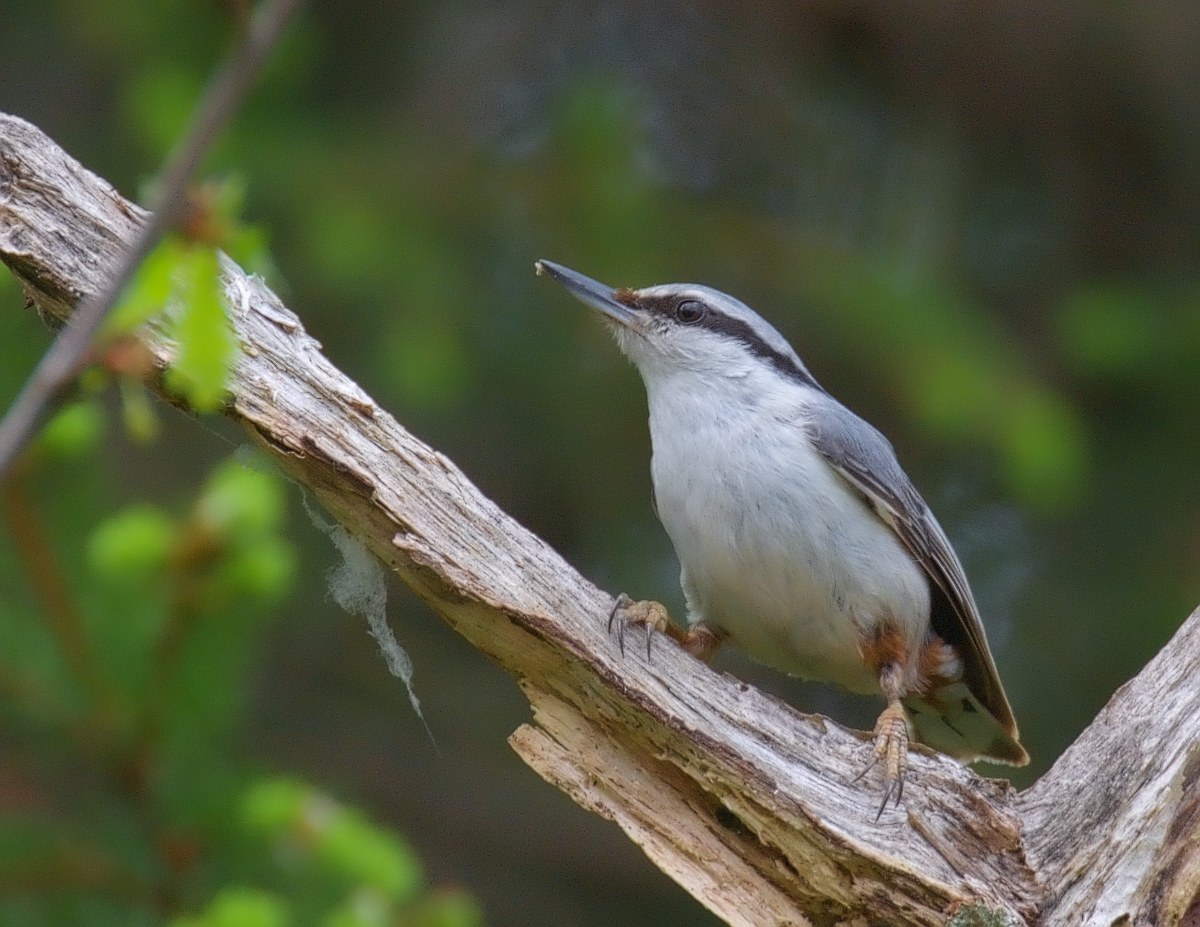
S. e. europaea (Sweden), part of the eponymous group of subspecies

Subspecies listed geographically (Note: Harrap and Quinn lump S. e. baicalensis, S. e. takatsukasai, S. e. clara and S. e. hondoensis into S. e. asiaticus)
Subspecies	Authority	Range	Description
S. e. europaea	Linnaeus, 1758	Southern Scandinavia and the Baltic islands, western Russia, eastern Poland, Romania and Bulgaria, northwest Turkey and Ukraine	The nominate subspecies. Upperparts blue-grey, black eye-stripe. Throat and underparts off-white or creamy, rusty red flanks and rear
S. e. asiatica	Gould, 1837	Central Russia west to Lake Baikal, north Kazakhstan and west Mongolia	As nominate, but smaller. Shorter and more pointed bill, white forehead and supercilium
S. e. arctica	Buturlin, 1907	Northeast Siberia.	Large with a narrower and shorter black eye-stripe than any other form, little white on the forehead or supercilium. Breast and centre of underparts white, flanks extensively chestnut
S. e. baicalensis	Taczanowski, 1882	Siberia east from Lake Baikal, central Mongolia and northeast China	Larger than S. e. asiatica, with a longer bill and darker upperparts, little white on forehead and supercilium
S. e. sakhalinensis	Buturlin, 1916	Sakhalin Island	Much smaller than S. e. baicalensis with slightly paler upperparts and a white forehead. Short bill
S. e. clara	Stejneger, 1887	Southern Kurils and Hokkaido (Japan)	Larger than S. e. asiatica, relatively pale upperparts, paler more obvious white forehead and supercilium
S. e. takatsukasai	Momiyama, 1931	Central Kuril Islands	Largest bill of all the subspecies. Pure white belly, greyer upperparts, upperparts similarly pale but not so bluish, strong white forehead and supercilium
S. e. albifrons	Taczanowski, 1882	Northeast Russia and the northern Kuril Islands	Large with heavy bill, dark upperparts, buff tint to belly
S. e. amurensis	R. Swinhoe, 1871	Russian Manchuria, Primorsky Krai (Russia), northeast China and Korea	Large with massive bill, upperparts darker than S. e. baicalensis, little white, if any, on white of forehead or supercilium
S. e. hondoensis	Buturlin, 1916	Honshu, Shikoku and northern Kyushu (Japan)	Similar to S. e. amurensis, but upperparts slightly paler and bluer, prominent white forehead and supercilium, bill slightly smaller
S. e. roseillia	Bonaparte, 1850	Southern Kyushu	Similar to S. e. amurensis, but upperparts darker, lower breast and belly more rufous-tinged
S. e. bedfordi	Ogilvie-Grant, 1909	Cheju Island, South Korea	Similar to S. e. roseillia, but throat and breast whiter and belly darker orange-buff
S. e. seorsa	Portenko, 1955	Northwest China	Like S. e. asiatica but slightly larger, white of forehead and supercilium more prominent and belly pale buff

== S. e. sinensis group ==
Subspecies in the S. e. sinensis group are found in south and east China, as well as Taiwan. They have a buff breast and throat.

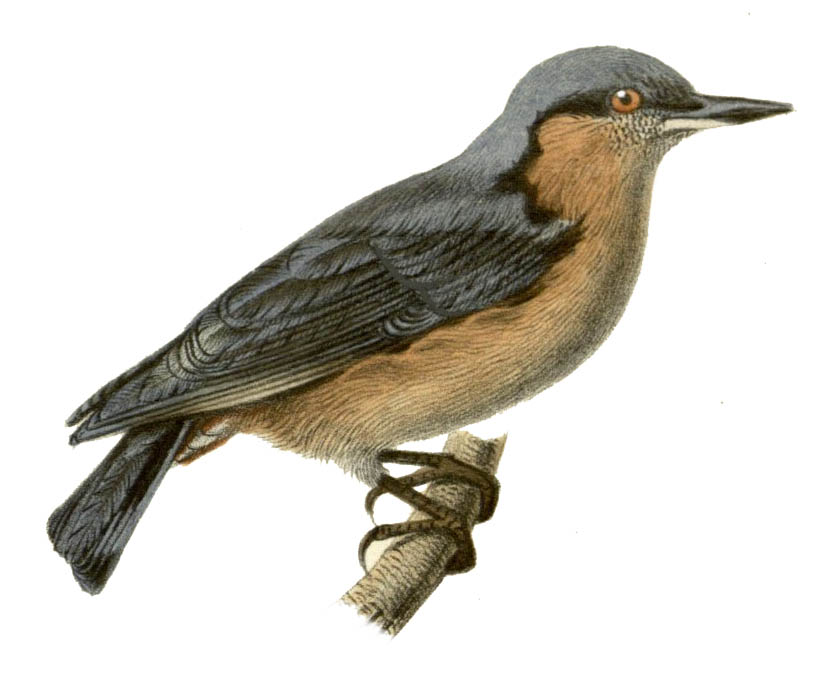
S. e. sinensis, part of the eponymous group. An 1873 painting by J. Hüet.

Subspecies listed geographically (Note: Harrap and Quinn lump S. e. formosana into S. e. sinensis)
Subspecies	Authority	Range	Description
S. e. sinensis	Verreaux, 1870	South and east China	Throat and underparts pale buff, brighter on sides, rear flanks brick-red
S. e. formosana	Buturlin, 1911	Taiwan	Like S. e. sinensis but smaller with longer bill, pale upperparts and whitish forehead
