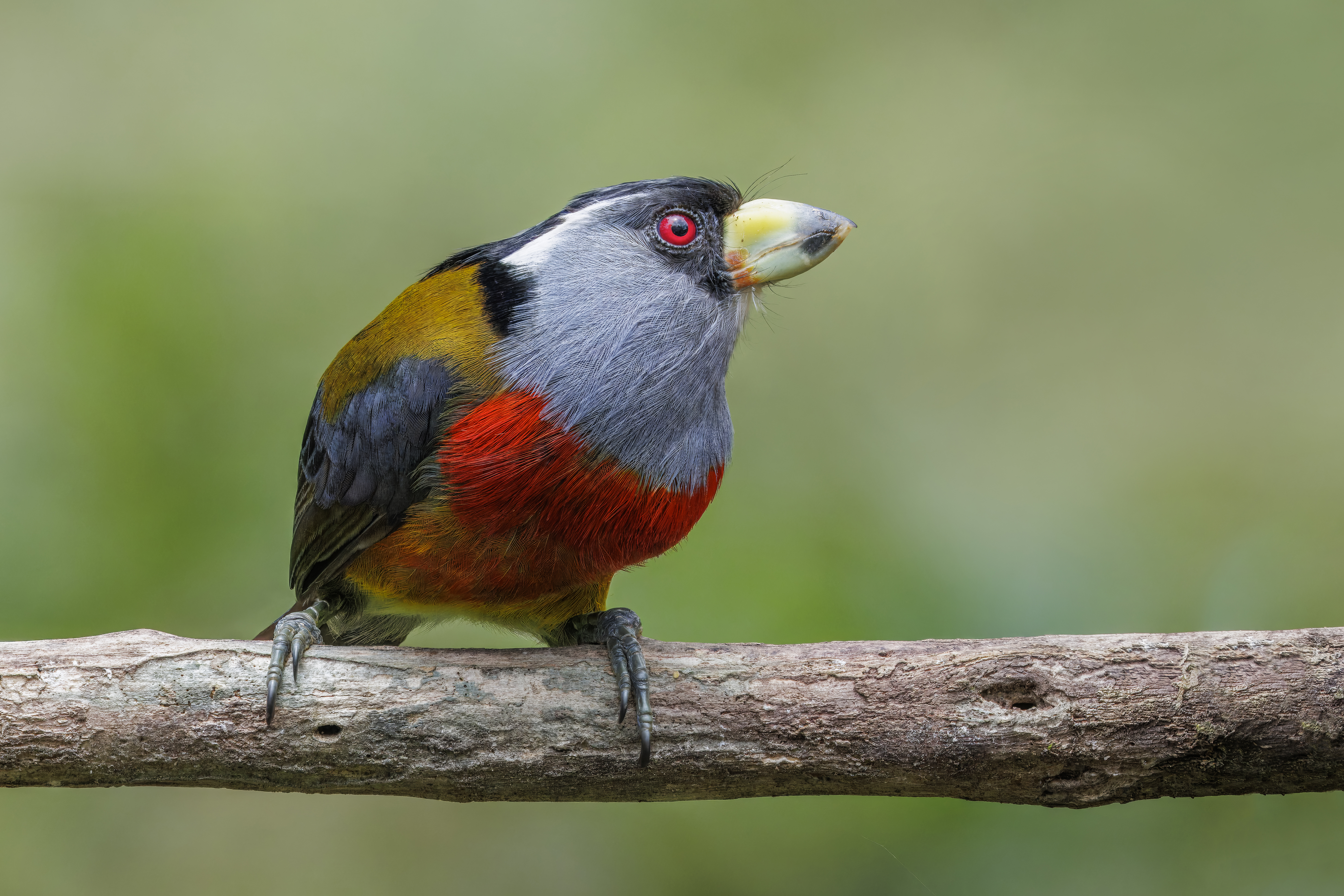
- Toucan barbet (S. ramphastinus)

Scientific classification
- Kingdom: Animalia
- Phylum: Chordata
- Class: Aves
- Order: Piciformes
- Suborder: Pici
- Infraorder: Ramphastides
- Family: Semnornithidae; Prum, 1988
- Genus: Semnornis; Richmond, 1900

Species
- Semnornis frantzii Semnornis ramphastinus

Synonyms
- Pan (preoccupied); Tetragonops (preoccupied)

= Semnornis =

Toucan-barbets

Genus of birds

The toucan-barbets are small birds in the genus Semnornis. The genus was often included in the paraphyletic barbets, but recently is usually classified into a distinct family, Semnornithidae; alternatively, all barbets might be moved to the toucan family Ramphastidae as a subfamily, Semnornithinae. Toucan-barbets comprise only two species: the toucan barbet (S. ramphastinus) and the prong-billed barbet (S. frantzii).

== Taxonomy ==
The phylogenetic relationship between the toucan-barbets and the eight other families in the order Piciformes is shown in the cladogram below. The number of species in each family is taken from the list maintained by Frank Gill, Pamela C. Rasmussen and David Donsker on behalf of the International Ornithological Committee (IOC).

- Piciformes
  - Galbuli
    - Galbulidae – jacamars (18 species)
    - Bucconidae – puffbirds (38 species)
  - Pici
    - Picides
      - Indicatoridae – honeyguides (16 species)
      - Picidae – woodpeckers (240 species)
    - Ramphastides
      - Megalaimidae – Asian barbets (35 species)
      - - Lybiidae – African barbets (42 species)
        - - Capitonidae – New World barbets (15 species)
          - - Semnornithidae – toucan barbets (2 species)
            - Ramphastidae – toucans (43 species)

== Description ==
The Semnornis barbets are fairly large barbets, measuring between 18 and 21 cm (7.1 and 8.3 in). The toucan barbet is larger than the prong-billed barbet and considerably heavier. They possess large, swollen bills and lack strong sexual dimorphism in their plumage. The plumage of the prong-billed barbet is orange-brown, and that of the toucan barbet is more distinctively patterned with black, red, grey and gold.

== Distribution and habitat ==
The Semnornis toucan-barbets are found in the Neotropics. The prong-billed barbet is restricted to the humid highland forests of Costa Rica and Panama. The toucan barbet is found in similar habitats in the western montane forests of Ecuador and Colombia. In addition to primary forest they may occupy forest edges and secondary growth. Neither species is migratory, and young birds do not appear to disperse very far after fledging; young toucan barbets only disperse 0.5 km.

== Behaviour ==
The Semnornithidae are highly social, and may be seen either in small groups of up to five or six individuals, or as singles. They are active during the day and are early risers. The prong-billed barbet sleeps in communal roosts at night in the non-breeding season. As many as 19 birds may roost together in a hole, which is either a modified nest or the abandoned nest of a woodpecker. During the breeding season pairs roost in their own nests.

=== Diet and feeding ===
The diet of these two species is made up of fruits and insects. The ratio of the two dietary components is more similar to that of the toucans than other barbets and is dominated by fruits. A 1993 study of the stomach contents of these two species found only fruit. Fruits may be eaten whole, held in the foot and broken and eaten, or crushed and only the juices eaten. Insects are more common in the diet of nestlings, and compose 40% of the food brought to the nest in toucan-barbets. Toucan-barbets may also feed their chicks small numbers of vertebrates. They have also been recorded eating flowers.

=== Breeding ===
Both species of toucan-barbet are monogamous breeders. Prong-billed barbets defend breeding territories from all others of their species. Toucan barbets, on the other hand, have territories but are helped in raising the young by helpers.

== Species ==
Genus Semnornis – Richmond, 1900 – two species
Common name	Scientific name and subspecies	Range	Size and ecology	IUCN status and estimated population
Prong-billed barbet	Semnornis frantzii (Sclater, PL, 1864)	Costa Rica and western Panama	Size: Habitat: Diet:	LC
Toucan barbet	Semnornis ramphastinus (Jardine, 1855)	western Ecuador and Colombia	Size: Habitat: Diet:	NT
