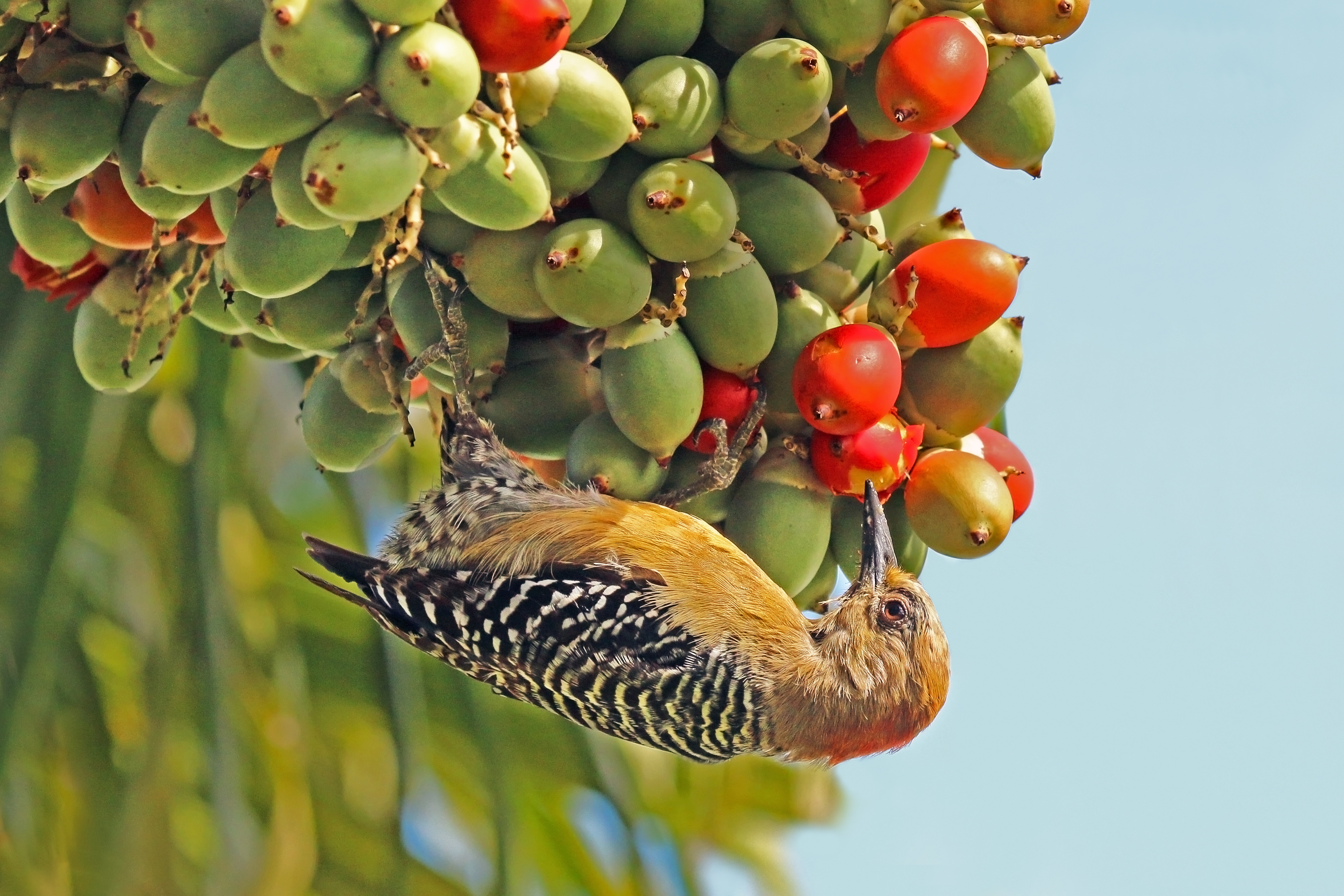
- Red-crowned woodpecker Melanerpes rubricapillus rubricapillus female, Tobago

Scientific classification
- Kingdom: Animalia
- Phylum: Chordata
- Class: Aves
- Clade: Picodynastornithes
- Order: Piciformes; Meyer & Wolf, 1810

Suborders and families
- Galbuli; Bucconidae; Galbulidae; Pici; Ramphastides; Megalaimidae; Lybiidae; Capitonidae; Semnornithidae; Ramphastidae; Picides; Indicatoridae; Picidae; For prehistoric taxa, see text

Synonyms
- Galbuliformes Fürbringer, 1888

= Piciformes =

Piciformes Temporal range: Early Eocene to present

Order of birds

Nine families of largely arboreal birds make up the order Piciformes (/ˈpɪsɪfɔːrmiːz/), the best-known of them being the Picidae, which includes the woodpeckers and close relatives. The Piciformes contain about 71 living genera with a little over 450 species, of which the Picidae make up about half.

In general, the Piciformes are insectivorous, although the barbets and toucans mostly eat fruit and the honeyguides are unique among birds in being able to digest beeswax (although insects make up the bulk of their diet). Nearly all Piciformes have parrot-like zygodactyl feet—two toes forward and two back, an arrangement that has obvious advantages for birds that spend much of their time on tree trunks. An exception are a few species of three-toed woodpeckers. The jacamars aside, Piciformes do not have down feathers at any age, only true feathers. They range in size from the rufous piculet at 8 centimetres in length, and weighing 7 grams, to the toco toucan, at 63 centimetres long, and weighing 680 grams. All nest in cavities and have altricial young.

== Taxonomy ==
The Galbulidae and Bucconidae are often separated into a distinct Galbuliformes order. Analysis of nuclear genes confirms that they form a lineage of their own, but suggests that they are better treated as a suborder. The other families form another monophyletic group of suborder rank, but the barbets were determined to be paraphyletic with regard to the toucans and hence, the formerly all-encompassing Capitonidae have been split up. The woodpeckers and honeyguides are each other's closest relatives. According to some researchers, the entire order Piciformes should be included as a subgroup in Coraciiformes.

The phylogenetic relationship between the nine families that make up the order Piciformes is shown in the cladogram below. The number of species in each family is taken from the list maintained by Frank Gill, Pamela C. Rasmussen and David Donsker on behalf of the International Ornithological Committee (IOC).

- Piciformes
  - - Galbulidae – jacamars (18 species)
    - Bucconidae – puffbirds (38 species)
  - - - Indicatoridae – honeyguides (16 species)
      - Picidae – woodpeckers (240 species)
    - - Megalaimidae – Asian barbets (35 species)
      - - Lybiidae – African barbets (42 species)
        - - Capitonidae – New World barbets (15 species)
          - - Semnornithidae – toucan barbets (2 species)
            - Ramphastidae – toucans (43 species)

== Evolution ==
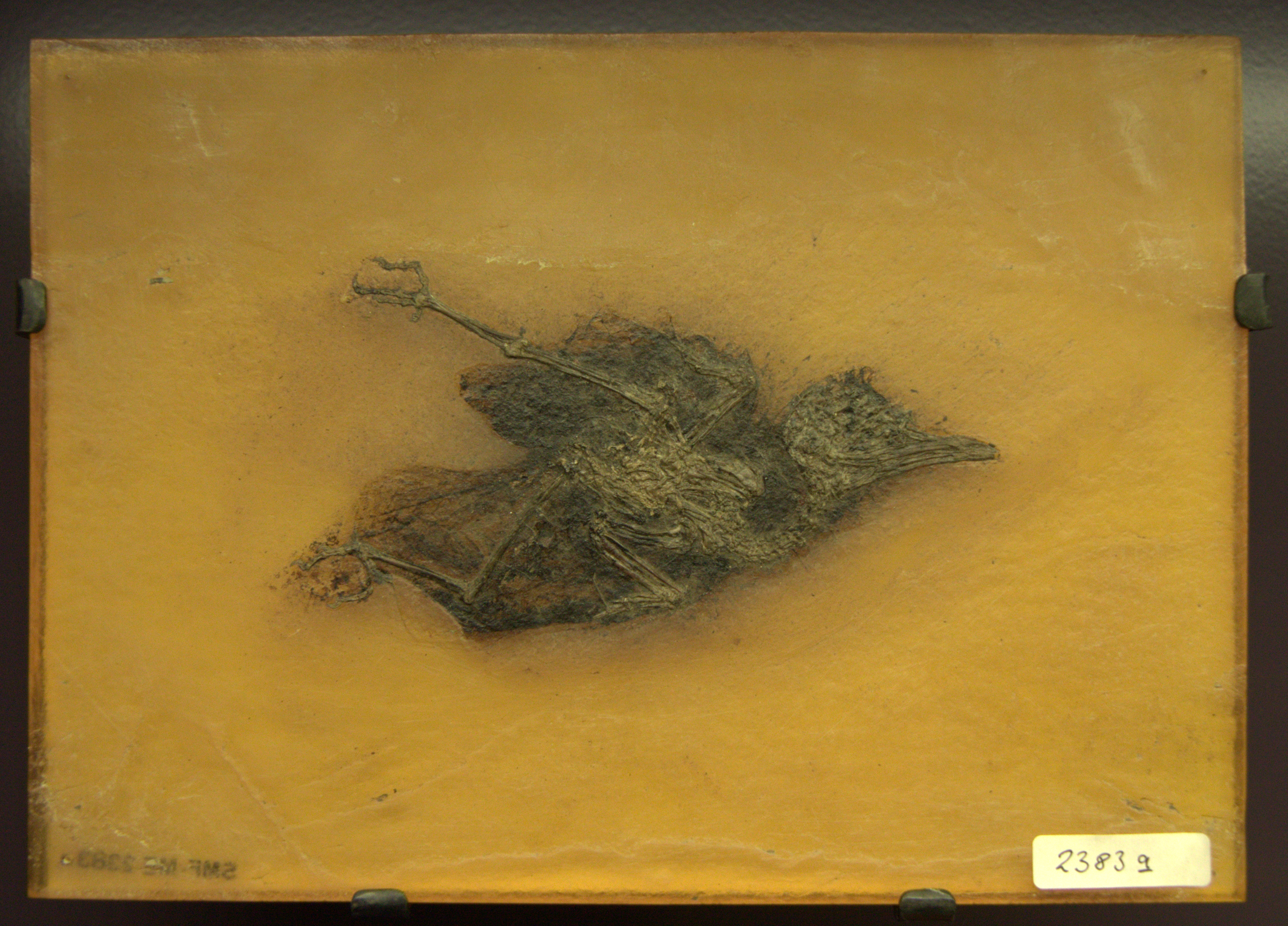
Primozygodactylus, a zygodactylid bird

Reconstruction of the evolutionary history of the Piciformes has been hampered by poor understanding of the evolution of the zygodactyl foot. A number of prehistoric families and genera, from the Early Eocene Neanis and Hassiavis, the Zygodactylidae/Primoscenidae, Gracilitarsidae, Sylphornithidae, and "Homalopus", to the Miocene "Picus" gaudryi and the Pliocene Bathoceleus are sometimes tentatively assigned to this order. There are some extinct ancestral Piciformes known from fossils which have been difficult to place but at least in part probably belong to the Pici. The modern families are known to exist since the mid-late Oligocene to early Miocene; consequently, the older forms appear to be more basal. A large part of Piciform evolution seems to have occurred in Europe where only Picidae occur today; perhaps even some now exclusively Neotropical families have their origin in the Old World.

== Classification ==
Order: PICIFORMES

- Unassigned (all fossil)
  - Piciformes gen. et sp. indet. IRScNB Av 65 (Early Oligocene of Boutersem, Belgium)
  - Piciformes gen. et sp. indet. SMF Av 429 (Late Oligocene of Herrlingen, Germany)
- Suborder Galbuli
  - Family Galbulidae – jacamars (18 species)
  - Family Bucconidae – puffbirds, nunbirds and nunlets (some 38 species)
- Suborder Pici
  - Unresolved and basal taxa (all fossil)
    - Genus Rupelramphastoides (Early Oligocene of Frauenweiler, Germany)
    - Pici gen. et sp. indet. (Middle Miocene of Grive-Saint-Alban, France)
    - Family Miopiconidae (fossil)
    - Family Picavidae (fossil)
  - Infraorder Ramphastides
    - Family Megalaimidae – Asian barbets (about 35 species)
    - Family Lybiidae – African barbets (about 43 species)
    - Family Capitonidae – New World barbets (about 15 species)
    - Family Semnornithidae – toucan barbets (2 species)
    - Family Ramphastidae – toucans (about 43 species)
  - Infraorder Picides
    - Family Indicatoridae – honeyguides (16 species)
    - Family Picidae – woodpeckers, piculets and wrynecks (around 240 species)

== See also ==
- List of Piciformes by population
