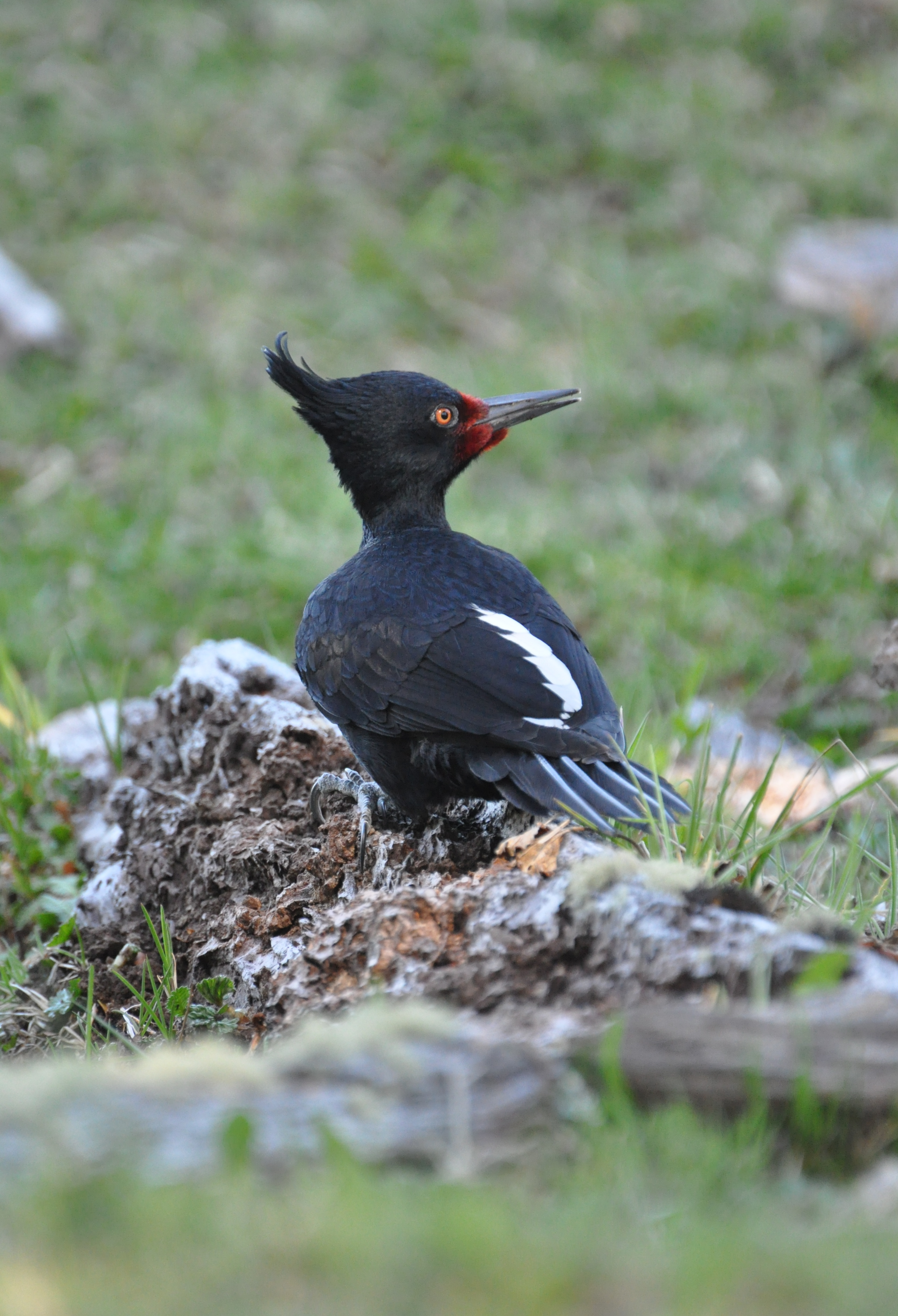
- Female Magellanic woodpecker (Campephilus magellanicus)

Scientific classification
- Kingdom: Animalia
- Phylum: Chordata
- Class: Aves
- Order: Piciformes
- Suborder: Pici; Meyer & Wolf, 1810

Infraorders and families
- Ramphastides; Megalaimidae; Lybiidae; Capitonidae; Semnornithidae; Ramphastidae; Picides; Indicatoridae; Picidae

= Pici (taxon) =

Suborder of birds

Pici is one of the two suborders of the order Piciformes. It includes two infraorders, Ramphastides (toucans and barbets) and Picides (honeyguides and woodpeckers). Members of this suborder have been called "true piciforms", as the jacamars of Galbulidae and puffbirds of Bucconidae (of the other piciform suborder Galbuli) were for a time thought to be not closely related to toucans and woodpeckers, but instead to the order Coraciiformes. However, analysis of nuclear DNA confirmed that Galbuli and Pici are sister groups, and thus their similarities such as zygodactyl feet were inherited from their common ancestor. Some classifications continue to treat Galbuli as a separate order (Galbuliformes), in which case Piciformes becomes equivalent in scope to Pici.
