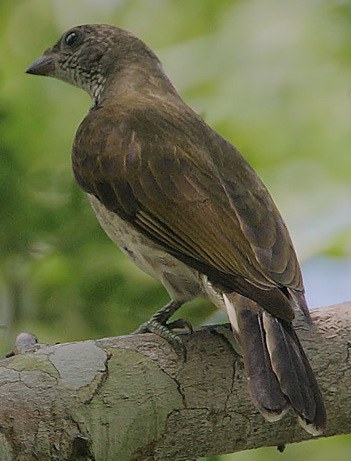
- Scaly-throated honeyguide (Indicator variegatus)

Scientific classification
- Domain: Eukaryota
- Kingdom: Animalia
- Phylum: Chordata
- Class: Aves
- Order: Piciformes
- Suborder: Pici
- Infraorder: Picides; Meyer & Wolf, 1810

Families
- Indicatoridae; Picidae

= Picides =

Infraorder of birds

Picides is an infraorder of the order Piciformes that includes woodpeckers and honeyguides. The honeyguides were thought to be closely related to the barbets, as their aerial displays and vocalizations are more similar to each other than either are to woodpeckers. However, phylogenetic analysis has shown that honeyguides and woodpeckers are indeed sister taxa.

== Systematics ==
Despite having only two families, Picides is an extremely widespread group; the family Picidae is the largest and most widespread in the order Piciformes, containing over 200 species in three subfamilies and being found on all continents except Australia and Antarctica.

- Infraorder Picides
  - Family Indicatoridae (honeyguides)
  - Family Picidae
    - Subfamily Jynginae (wrynecks)
    - Subfamily Picumninae (piculets)
    - Subfamily Picinae (woodpeckers)
