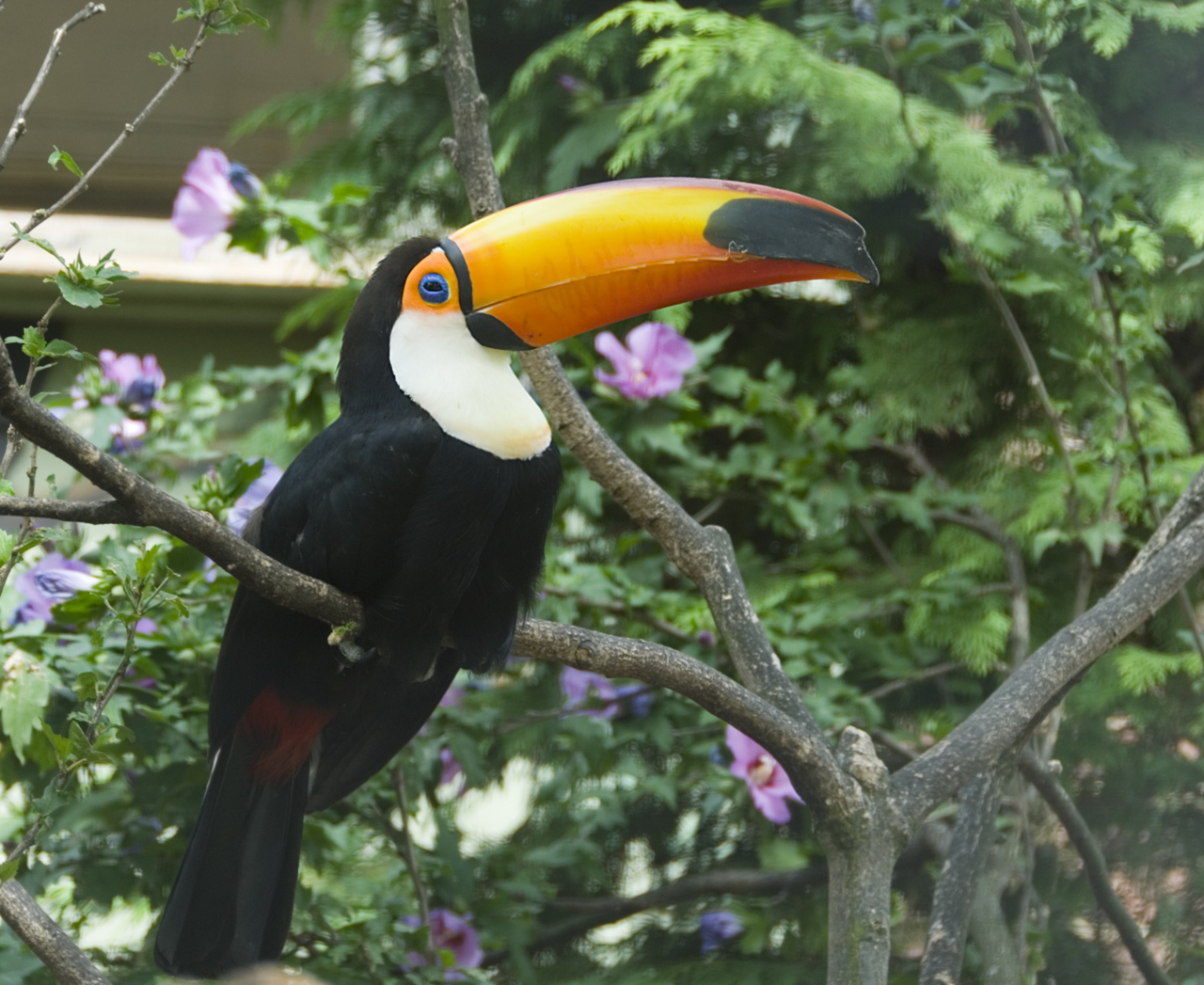
- Toco toucan (Ramphastos toco)

Scientific classification
- Kingdom: Animalia
- Phylum: Chordata
- Class: Aves
- Order: Piciformes
- Suborder: Pici
- Infraorder: Ramphastides; Vigors, 1825

Families
- Megalaimidae; Lybiidae; Capitonidae; Ramphastidae; Semnornithidae

= Ramphastides =

Toucans and Barbets

Infraorder of birds

Ramphastides is an infraorder of the order Piciformes that includes toucans and barbets. Formerly, the barbets have been classified in a single family, the Capitonidae. However, this has turned out to be paraphyletic about toucans, which resulted in the Capitonidae being split into several families.

== Systematics ==
The Ramphastides contain five extant families. Sometimes, they are treated as the superfamily Ramphastoidea.

- Infraorder Ramphastides
  - Megalaimidae - Asian barbets
  - Lybiidae - African barbets
  - Capitonidae - New World barbets
  - Semnornithidae - toucan-barbets
  - Ramphastidae - toucans
