= Johann Wolf (naturalist) =

German naturalist and ornithologist (1765–1824)

Johann Wolf (26 May 1765 in Nürnberg – 16 February 1824) was a German naturalist and ornithologist.

He was a Member of the German Academy of Sciences Leopoldina.

== Works ==
- Neue methodische Vorschriften für Erziehungs- und Schulanstalten
- Naturgeschichte der Vögel Deutschlands,
- Taschenbuch der Vogelkunde für Deutschland, Nürnberg 1810
- Abbildung und Beschreibung der Kreuzotter, Nürnberg 1815;
- Abbildungen und Beschreibung merkwürdiger naturwissenschaftlicher Gegenstände, 2 Bände, Nürnberg 1818–1822
- Ein sicheres und wohlfeiles Mittel, Insekten schnell und ohne Verletzung zu tödten, Nürnberg, 1803
- Der Steinkrebs, Nürnberg, 1805
