= Costa Rica–Germany relations =

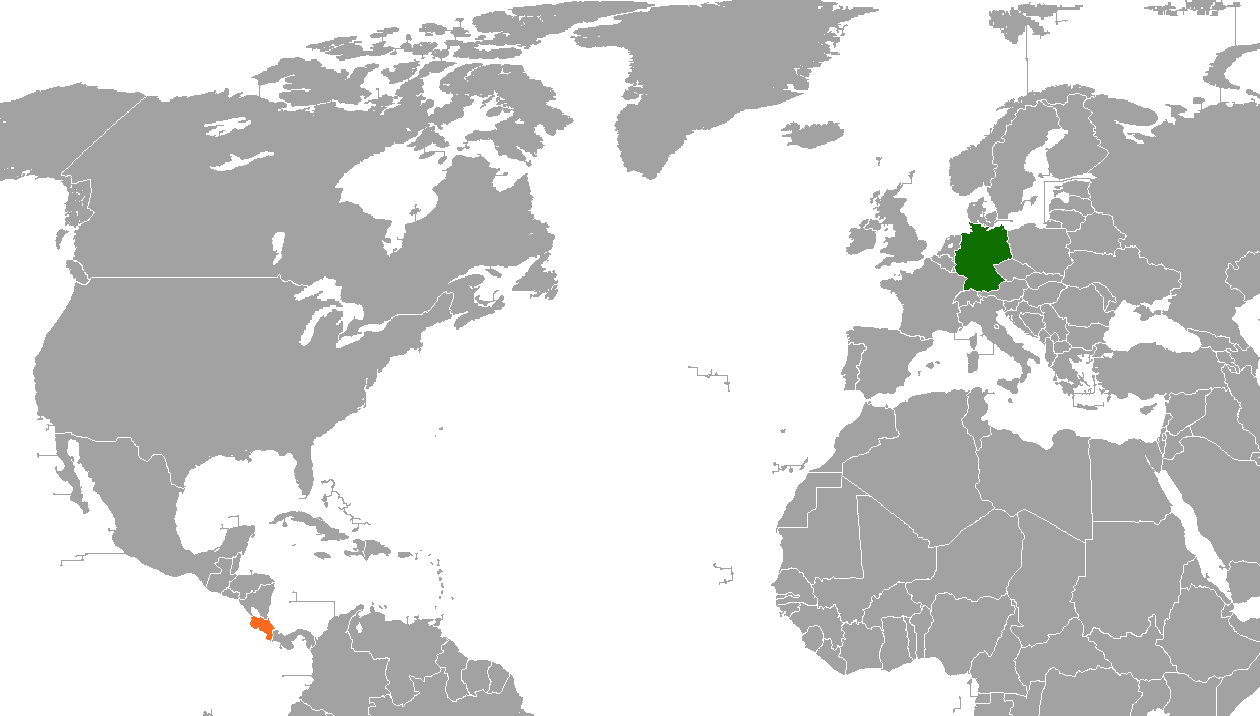

- Germany: Costa Rica

Costa Rica–Germany relations are the bilateral relations between Costa Rica and Germany. The Federal Foreign Office describes the mutual relations as "traditionally close and trusting".

== History ==
The First Costa Rican Republic and the German Confederation established diplomatic relations in 1848, when the president of Costa Rica was José María Castro Madriz. Madriz was interested, among other things, in the colonization of the country by German entrepreneurs and settlers. Although many of the ambitious projects promoted by Baron Alexander von Bülow's Berlin Colonization Society did not materialize, the reputation of the “rich coast” attracted an increasing number of German settlers and traders from the mid-19th century onwards, who settled in Costa Rica. In 1953, naturalist Karl Hoffmann traveled to Costa Rica with Alexander von Frantzius to study the local wildlife. He later served as a doctor in the Costa Rican army. In 1867, without the knowledge of Otto von Bismarck, Prussian Admiral Franz Kinderling negotiated with the Costa Rican government to establish a Prussian naval base in Puerto Limón. There was also talk of building a railroad line along the Atlantic coast through Prussia. However, neither project was ultimately realized.

After the unification of Germany in 1873, Siegfried Borchardt became the first resident minister of Costa Rica in Berlin. Economic relations were quite intensive in the 19th and early 20th centuries. In 1905, nine companies from the German Reich operating in Costa Rica had invested almost 15 million German marks here.

The outbreak of the First World War disrupted the good relations that had existed with Germany until then. Costa Rica declared war on Germany in 1917 under the regime of Federico Alberto Tinoco Granados, which had more of a symbolic impact but did lead to the confiscation of German assets in the country. His successor, Francisco Aguilar Barquero, revoked the declaration of war in 1918. After the war, economic relations intensified again and León Cortés Castro established close ties to Nazi Germany. Under his government, 40% of Costa Rican coffee exports went to Germany. He also made the German Max Effinger his advisor and prevented persecuted Jews from immigrating to Costa Rica from Germany. In December 1941, however, Costa Rica declared war on Nazi Germany and had the Germans interned in the country. In 1942, the German submarine U 161 sank the American freighter San Pablo of the United Fruit Company in the port of Puerto Limón.

After the end of World War II, Costa Rica established diplomatic relations with West Germany on October 7, 1952, and both sides exchanged ambassadors in the period that followed. In 1956, the German school in San José was reopened after being closed during the war. After West Germany abandoned the Hallstein Doctrine, Costa Rica also established diplomatic relations with the GDR in 1973. In 1987, the German-Costa Rican Chamber of Industry and Commerce was opened. After the German reunification, Costa Rica moved its embassy from Bonn to the new German capital, Berlin, in 2000, initially to Berlin-Kreuzberg., later to Berlin-Mitte.

== Economic relations ==
In 2024, German exports of goods to Costa Rica amounted to 416 million euros and imports from the country to 715 million euros. This put Costa Rica in 86th place in the ranking of Germany's trading partners. Of all the countries in Central America, Costa Rica is Germany's most important trading partner. Germany mainly imports foodstuffs from Costa Rica, such as coffee, pineapples and bananas, as well as medical technology and electronics. In return, Germany mainly exports mechanical, chemical and industrial products to Costa Rica. Tourism is also an important aspect of economic relations, with Germans increasingly discovering Costa Rica as a travel destination. The two countries concluded a bilateral investment protection and promotion agreement in 1998 and a double taxation agreement in 2016. A dedicated German-Cost Rica chamber of industry and commerce has helped to promote economic relations. In 2019, Costa Rica introduced dual vocational training based on the German model in some areas.

The Deutsche Gesellschaft für Internationale Zusammenarbeit is represented in Costa Rica and has almost 80 employees in the country. The KfW development bank prioritizes funding for projects in the field of renewable energies and energy efficiency in Costa Rica.

== Cultural relations ==
Several German cultural institutions are represented in Costa Rica. The German Abitur can be obtained at the bilingual Humboldt School in San José, founded in 1912. There is a Goethe-Zentrum in the Costa Rican capital of San José, which became the successor to the resident Goethe-Institut in 1999. The Goethe Center promotes German-Costa Rican cultural relations and the German language. In addition, branches of the Konrad Adenauer Foundation and the Friedrich Ebert Foundation are also active in Costa Rica. The German Academic Exchange Service is responsible for academic exchange, providing scholarships and signing a contract with the Council of Rectors of Costa Rican Universities (CONARE) in 1994. The preferred joint research areas are traditionally biology, geology and chemistry, but increasingly also environmental research and tropical agricultural sciences.

== Diplomatic locations ==
- Germany has an embassy in San José.
- Costa Rica has an embassy in Berlin.
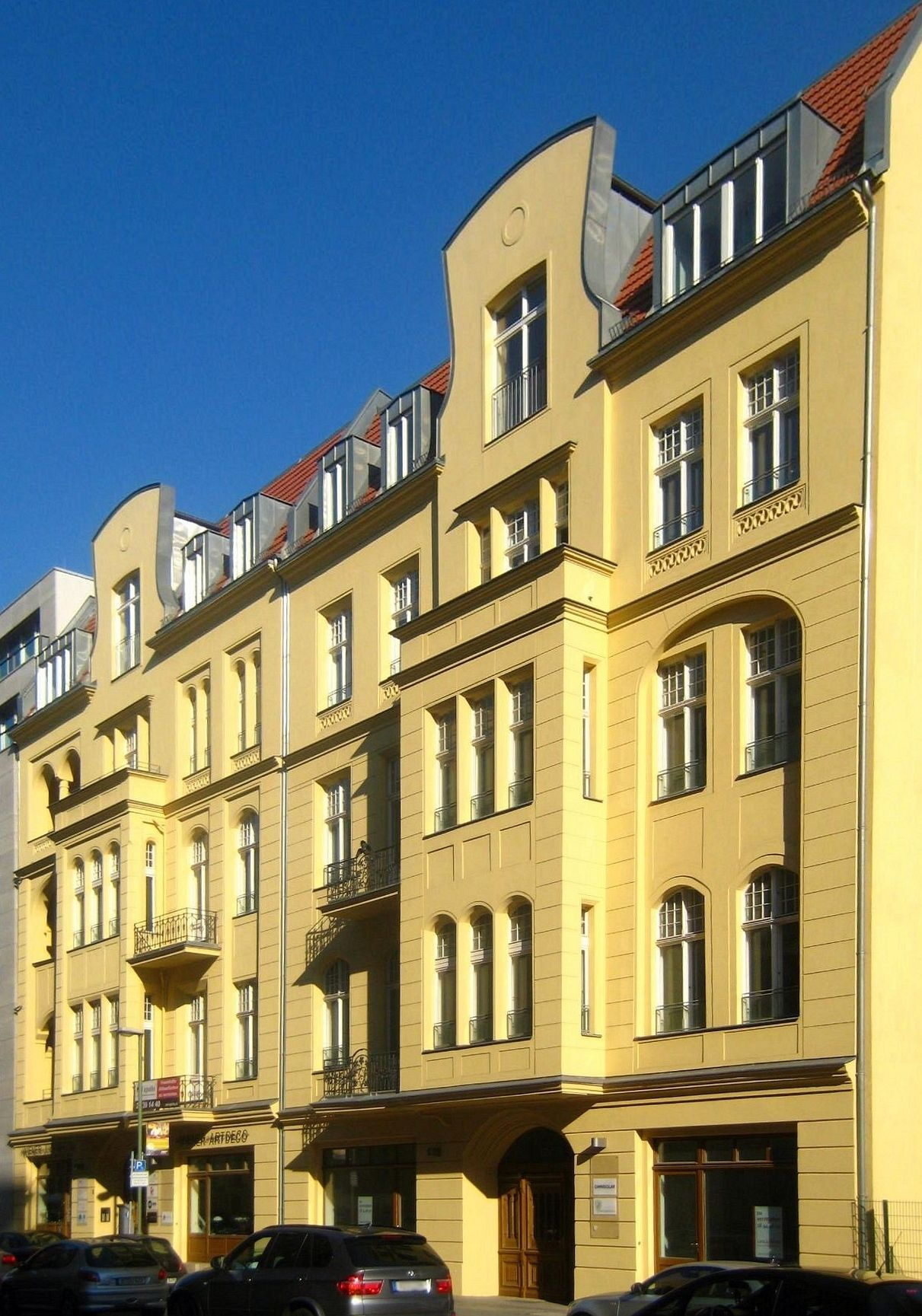
Embassy of Costa Rica in Berlin
