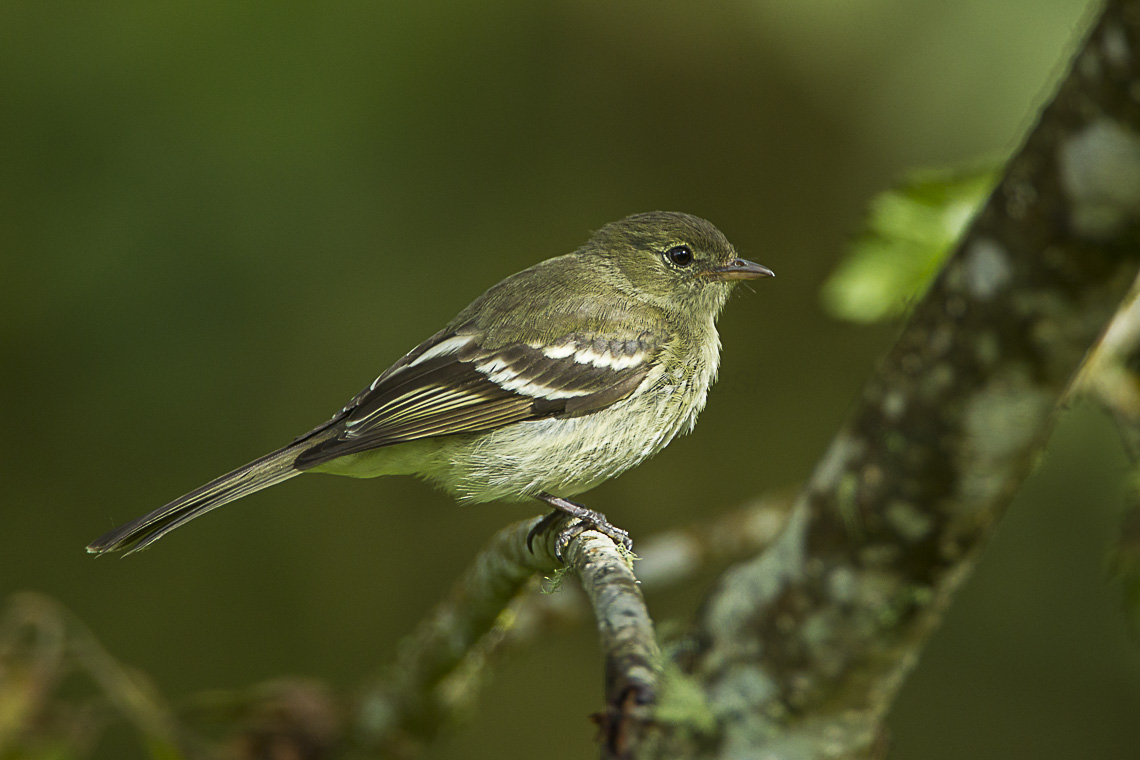

Conservation status
- Least Concern (IUCN 3.1)

Scientific classification
- Kingdom: Animalia
- Phylum: Chordata
- Class: Aves
- Order: Passeriformes
- Family: Tyrannidae
- Genus: Elaenia
- Species: E. frantzii

Binomial name
- Elaenia frantzii Lawrence, 1865

Subspecies
- See text

= Mountain elaenia =

Species of bird

The mountain elaenia (Elaenia frantzii) is a small passerine bird in subfamily Elaeniinae of family Tyrannidae, the tyrant flycatchers. It is found in Colombia, Costa Rica, El Salvador, Guatemala, Honduras, Nicaragua, Panama, and Venezuela.

== Taxonomy and systematics ==
The mountain elaenia has these four subspecies:

- E. f. ultima Griscom, 1935
- E. f. frantzii Lawrence, 1865
- E. f. browni Bangs, 1898
- E. f. pudica Sclater, PL, 1871

The three subspecies other than the nominate E. f. frantzii have bounced around as subspecies of other elaenia species before reaching their current status. However, vocal studies published in 2016 suggest that the species has only two subspecies, with ultima being absorbed into frantzii and browni being absorbed into pudica. There are further suggestions that the two putative subspecies should be treated as separate species.

At least one early twentieth century publication treated the mountain elaenia and highland elaenia (E. obscura) as conspecific but by the middle of the century that treatment had been abandoned, and early twenty-first century genetic studies showed that they are not closely related.

The mountain elaenia's specific epithet celebrates the German physician and naturalist Alexander von Frantzius, who collected the type specimen.

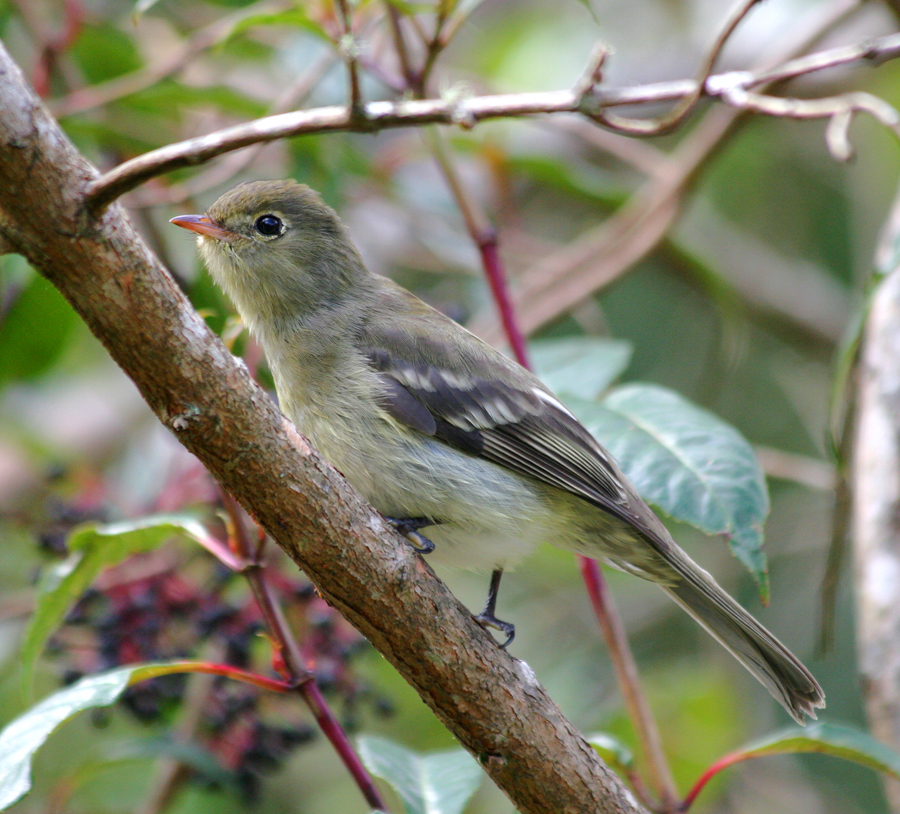
Savegre Valley, Costa Rica

== Description ==
The mountain elaenia is 14 to 15 cm (5.5 to 5.9 in) long and weighs about 14 to 24 g (0.49 to 0.85 oz). It is a small to medium size elaenia with a rounded crest. The sexes have the same plumage. Adults of the nominate subspecies have a brownish olive head with lighter cheeks, a thin very pale olive eyering, and a mostly hidden white patch on the crown. Their upperparts are grayish olive. Their wings are mostly dusky with pale olive or olive-yellow edges on the flight feathers. The tips of their wing coverts are yellowish olive and show as two bars on the closed wing. Their tail is grayish brown with pale olive-green feather edges. Their chin, throat, upper breast, and flanks are pale yellowish olive, and their lower breast, belly, and undertail coverts pale straw yellowish. Juveniles are similar to adults but browner above and paler below.

Subspecies E. f. ultima has browner (less greenish olive) upperparts and darker, more olivaceous, underparts than the nominate. E. f. pudica is smaller than the nominate and has darker upperparts and paler underparts. E. f. browni is smaller than pudica but with paler, more greenish olive, upperparts. Both sexes of all subspecies have a brown iris, a dark brown maxilla, an orange mandible with a dark brown tip, and dark brown legs and feet.

== Distribution and habitat ==
The mountain elaenia has a disjunct distribution. The subspecies are found thus:

- E. f. ultima: from Chiapas in southern Mexico south through Guatemala, El Salvador, and Honduras into northwestern Nicaragua
- E. f. frantzii: southern Nicaragua and after a gap from western Costa Rica to central Panama
- E. f. browni: the isolated Sierra Nevada de Santa Marta in northern Colombia and the separate Serranía del Perijá that straddles the Colombia-Venezuela border
- E. f. pudica: Colombia's Western and Central Andes, the Andes of western Venezuela, and the Venezuelan Coastal Range

Older field guides and other publications do not include Chiapas in the mountain elaenia's range; the species was not confirmed there until 2016. Similarly, earlier range maps do not extend to central Panama, where there are records starting in the mid 2010s.

The two Central American subspecies of the mountain elaenia primarily inhabit cloudforest but also occur in semi-open pine-oak forest and the edges of denser forest. In South America the species primarily inhabits open woodlands, scrublands, and pastures with scattered trees, and some coffee plantations and cloudforest in Colombia. In elevation it in occurs between 1,250 and 2,500 m (4,100 and 8,200 ft) in Central America, between 600 and 3,000 m (2,000 and 9,800 ft) in Colombia, between 1,200 and 2,900 m (3,900 and 9,500 ft) in the Venezuelan Andes, and between 1,200 and 2,250 m (3,900 and 7,400 ft) in the Serranía del Perijá.

== Behavior ==
=== Movement ===
The mountain elaenia is believed to be resident in northern Central America but appears to be an elevational migrant in Costa Rica, Colombia, and Venezuela. The timing and extent of these movements are not well understood.

=== Feeding ===
The mountain elaenia feeds on small fruits and on insects; fruits make up a larger part of its diet than is usual in its genus. It forages at all levels of the forest, typically staying in dense foliage. It finds food mostly by gleaning while perched, while briefly hovering, and with short sallies to take insect prey on the ground. It usually forages singly but may share a fruiting tree with numbers of its and other species, and sometimes briefly joins mixed-species feeding flocks.

=== Breeding ===
The mountain elaenia apparently does not form year-round pair bonds in the areas where it migrates. Almost of the data on its breeding biology come from Costa Rica. Its breeding season there spans at least from early April to June. Its nest is an open cup made of twigs with moss and lichen on the outside and a lining of rootlets and fungal rhizomorphs. The height above ground of 18 nests ranged from 2 to 15 m (7 to 50 ft). The clutch size averaged 1.9 eggs; they are dull white to pale buff with splotches that range in color from pale cinnamon to lilac-red. The female builds the nest and incubates the clutch. The incubation period was 15 days at two nests. Both parents provision nestlings. The time to fledging is not known.

=== Vocalization ===
The northern and southern pairs of subspecies of the mountain elaenia have somewhat different vocalizations, which is part of the evidence hinting that they are separate species. The dawn song of the northern pair is "an endless repetition of an overslurred whistle followed by a rising burry part and a higher-pitched second overslurred note, all three notes interconnected without a clear pause". Subspecies E. f. ultima sometimes sings a more complex variation of the basic song. Both have a "burry call" brrri and a "clear call" peee-er. The southern pair's dawn song is "a sharply inflected upslurred note followed without pause by a buzzy downslurred note and a sharp liquid note...wi-jit". Their "buzzy call" is zrreeu and their "clear call" is peuuwww.

== Status ==
The IUCN has assessed the mountain elaenia as being of Least Concern. It has a very large range; its estimated population of at least 500,000 mature individuals is believed to be decreasing. No immediate threats have been identified. Its density in Mexico has not yet been established. It is considered common in Costa Rica, Colombia, and Venezuela. "Due to its preference for open woodlands, the Mountain Elaenia tolerates some degree of urbanization and occurs in suburban habitats."
