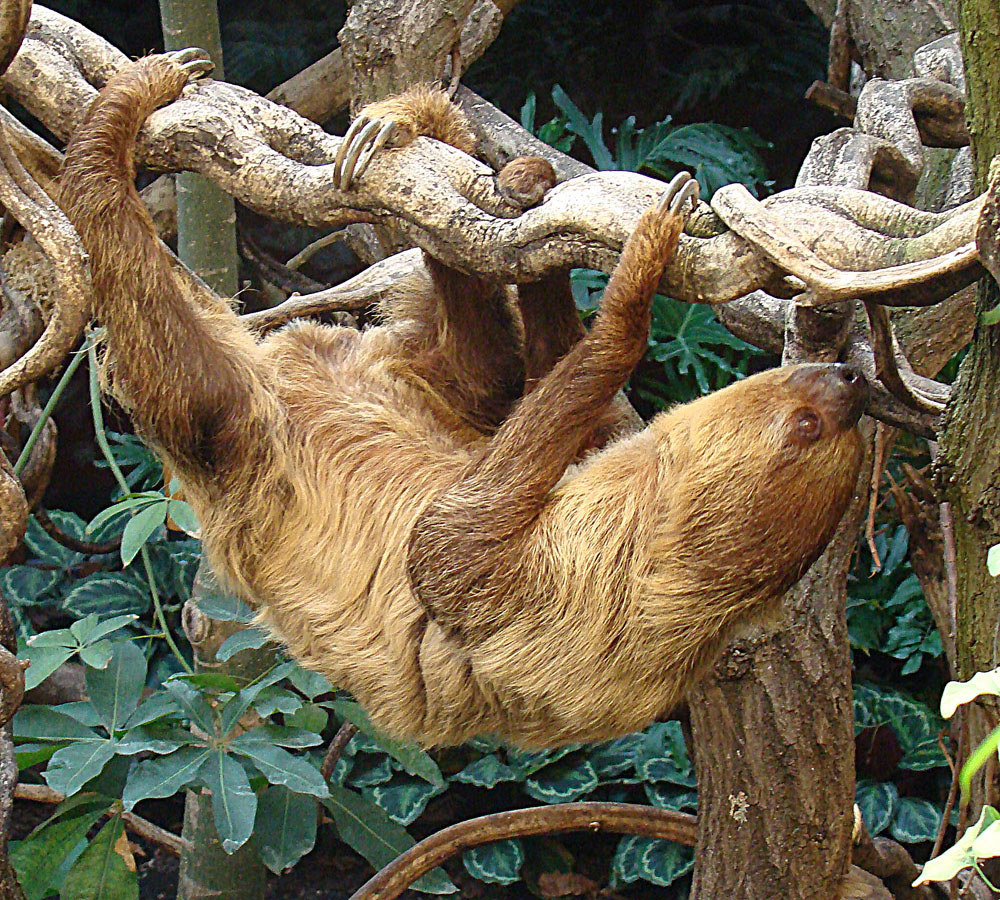
- At London Zoo

Conservation status
- Least Concern (IUCN 3.1)

Scientific classification
- Kingdom: Animalia
- Phylum: Chordata
- Class: Mammalia
- Order: Pilosa
- Suborder: Folivora
- Family: Choloepodidae
- Genus: Choloepus
- Species: C. didactylus

Binomial name
- Choloepus didactylus (Linnaeus, 1758)
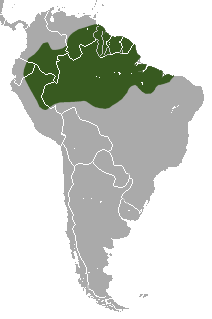
- Linnaeus's two-toed sloth range

Synonyms
- Bradypus didactylus Linnaeus, 1758

= Linnaeus's two-toed sloth =

Species of mammals related to anteaters and armadillos

Linnaeus's two-toed sloth (Choloepus didactylus), also known as the southern two-toed sloth, unau, or Linne's two-toed sloth is a species of sloth from South America, found in Venezuela, Suriname, Guyana, French Guiana, Colombia, Ecuador, Peru, and Brazil north of the Amazon River. There is now evidence suggesting the species' range expands into Bolivia. It's the largest extant sloth species.

== Description ==
Males and females are the same size, growing to lengths of approximately 53 to 89 cm (21 to 35 in), not including the length of the tail, and weigh approximately 4 to 11 kg (9 to 24 lb). Their fur color ranges from a brownish yellow to a pale tone of brown, however, in the wild their fur sometimes has a green hue from algae that grows on their fur during the rainy season. Their belly fur is slightly lighter in color than the body and they have no undercoat. The belly hair is parted along the midline and flows towards the animals back (spine), the opposite direction that fur flows on most other mammals. Young sloths tend to have softer and darker fur than adults.

== Phylogeny ==
Sloths belong to the order Pilosa, which also includes anteaters. They belong to the super order Xenarthra, which includes the Cingulata. Xenarthra are edentate or toothless. They lack incisors and have a large reduction in number of teeth with only four to five sets remaining including canines.

Modern sloths are divided into two families based on the number of toes on their front feet, Choloepodidae and Bradypodidae. Linnaeus's two-toed sloth and Hoffmann's two-toed sloth (Choloepus hoffmanni) belong to the family Choloepodidae, which included extinct ground sloths.

== Morphology ==
Choloepus didactylus are larger than three-toed sloths. They have longer hair, bigger eyes, and their back and front legs are more equal in length. Their ears, hind feet and head are generally larger than Bradypodidae. They do however have a shorter tail. Their shoulder height, the height from the shoulder blade to the tips of the claw is longer than three-toed sloths, indicating longer arms.

The species has relatively few teeth; it has four to five sets including canines and lacks incisors. Molars are indistinguishable from premolars. The teeth are rootless and lack enamel, consisting only of two layers ever-growing dentin. Supernumerary teeth have occasionally been observed, but this has been reported in almost all mammalian orders.

== Ecology ==
C. didactylus is a solitary, nocturnal and arboreal animal, found in rainforests. The two-toed sloth falls prey to South American coatis and wild cats such as the ocelot, margay and jaguar as well as harpy eagles. Predation mainly occurs when the sloth descends to the ground in order to defecate or change trees. Anacondas have also been known to hunt sloths. It is able to swim, making it possible to cross rivers and creeks, but maybe also making it more available to a predator like a green anaconda.

Two-toed sloths live in ever-wet tropical rainforests that are hot and humid. They tend to live in areas where there is a lot of vine growth so they can easily travel from tree to tree in the canopies of the forests. They mainly eat leaves, but there is lacking data on the extent of their diet due to their nocturnal lifestyle and camouflage.

C. didactylus, similar to other sloth species, have a low rate of metabolism, food intake, and defecation, despite their relatively large body mass and their high volumes of methane production. They retain their digested material for long periods of time, due to a combination of their low defecation rates and large digestive systems. This long digestion period appears to cause the sloths' high volumes of methane production, more than most other, similar herbivores. These high methane levels may also be the result of high formate levels in their digested material.

== See also ==
- Emmons, Louise H.; Feer, François (1997-09-02). Neotropical rainforest mammals. A field guide (2nd ed.). Chicago: University of Chicago Press. p. 45. ISBN 978-0-226-20721-6. OCLC 44179508.

== Gallery ==
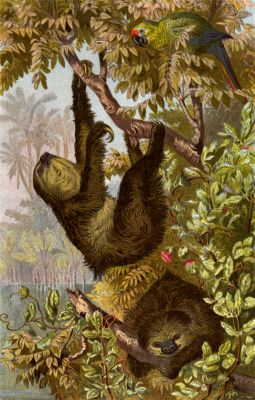
1883 painting

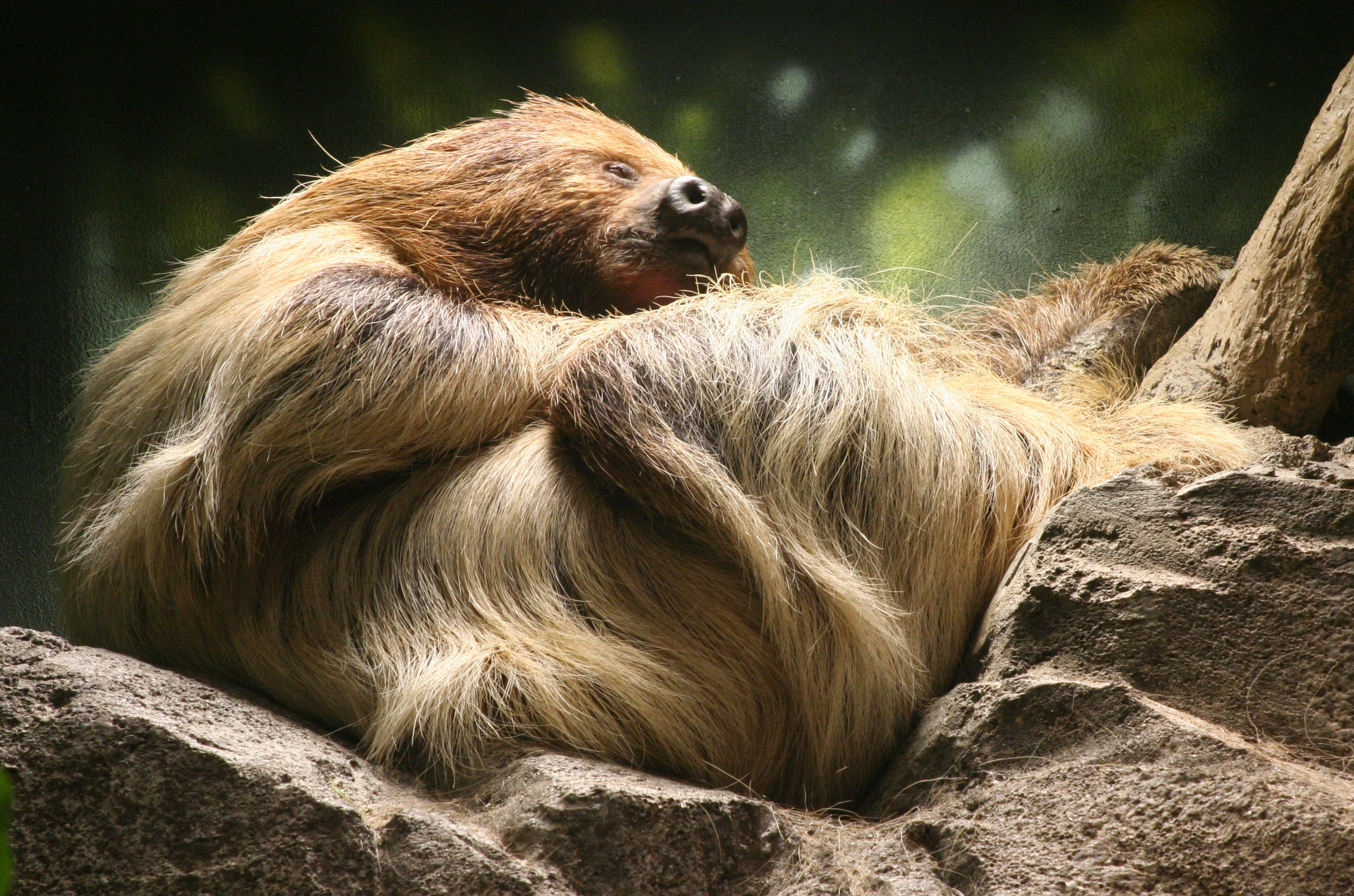
Choelopus didactylus at Buffalo Zoo

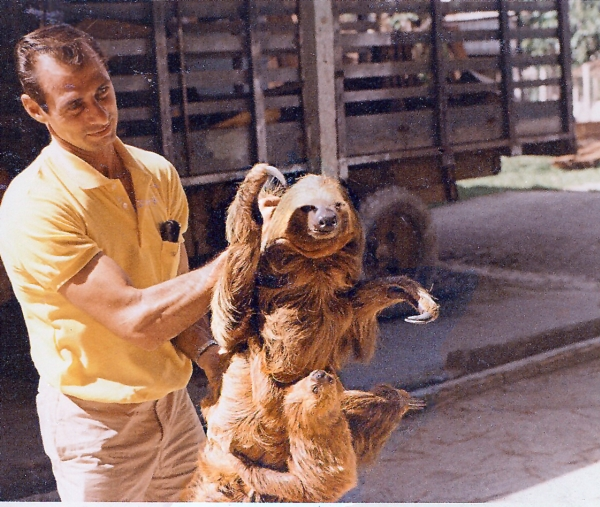
Sloth & baby, caught at Leticia, Colombia
