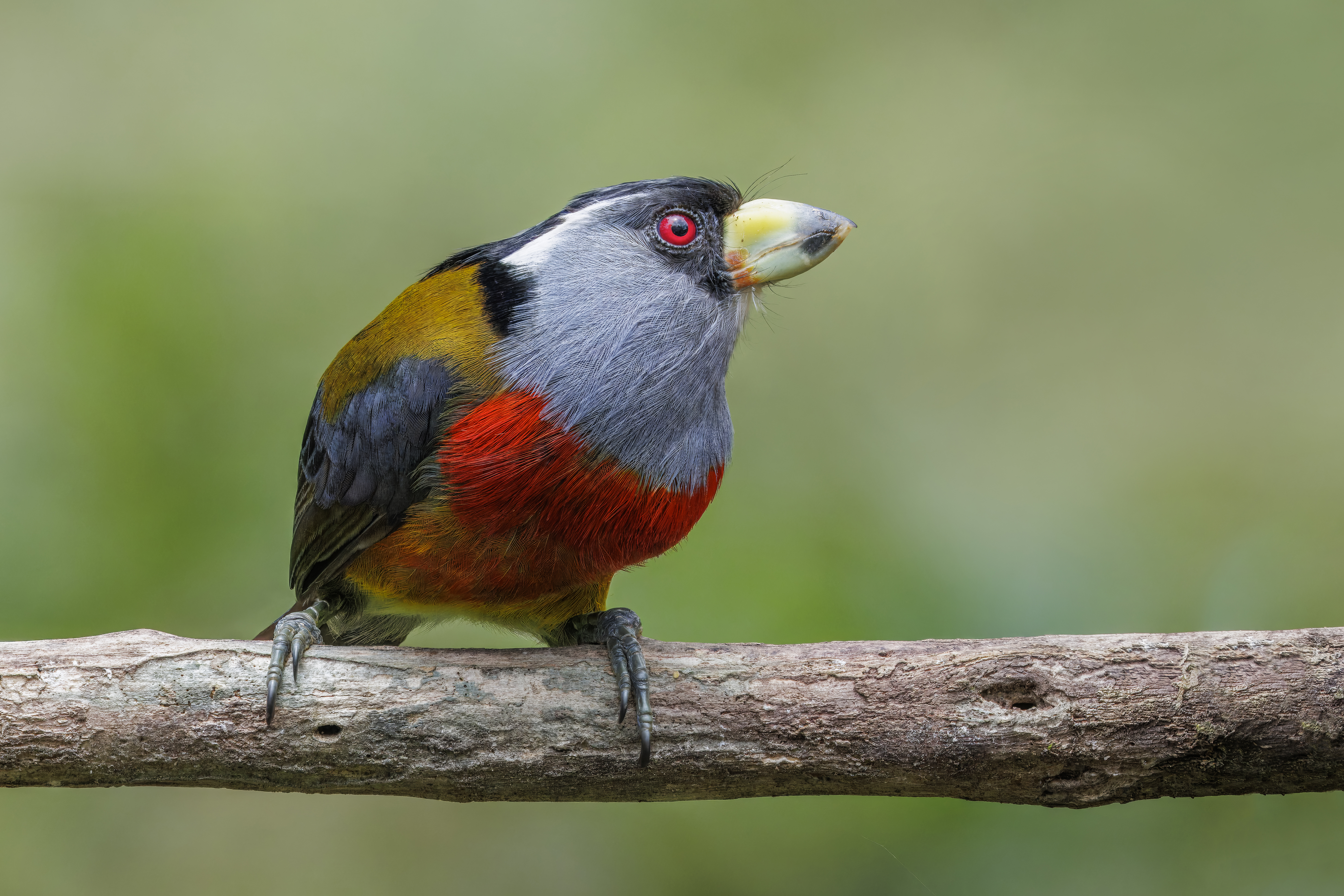
- in Ecuador

Conservation status
- Near Threatened (IUCN 3.1)

Scientific classification
- Kingdom: Animalia
- Phylum: Chordata
- Class: Aves
- Order: Piciformes
- Family: Semnornithidae
- Genus: Semnornis
- Species: S. ramphastinus

Binomial name
- Semnornis ramphastinus (Jardine, 1855)

= Toucan barbet =

Species of bird

The toucan barbet (Semnornis ramphastinus) is a barbet native to western Ecuador and Colombia. Along with the prong-billed barbet, it forms the family Semnornithidae, and is closely related to the toucans. It is a medium-sized barbet with a robust yellow bill. It has striking plumage, having a black head with grey throat and nape, red breast and upper belly, yellow lower belly and grey wings and tail.

The toucan barbet is native to humid montane forests, where it occupies all levels of the canopy and is found in both primary and secondary forests, as well as forest edges. It is social, living in small family groups which work together to defend their territories and raise the chicks communally. It feeds on fruit and a range of animal prey, with insects being an important part of the diet of chicks. It sometimes joins mixed-species feeding flocks. Chicks are raised in cavities dug into large, usually dead trees.

Young toucan barbets are preyed upon by plate-billed mountain toucans. The species is considered to be near threatened, mainly due to trapping for the cage-bird trade. It has also declined due to habitat loss, particularly the loss of large trees in which to breed, although the species is adaptable if left unmolested.

== Taxonomy and systematics ==
The toucan barbet was described by the Scottish naturalist William Jardine, who placed it in the new genus Tetragonops. The specific name, ramphastinus, is modern Latin for toucan-like, based on Linnaeus' genus Ramphastos (1758). In 1899, Charles Richmond of the United States National Museum discovered that the genus name was preoccupied (meaning it had been used earlier for another genus) and placed the toucan barbet and its sister species the prong-billed barbet (Semnornis frantzii) in a new genus Pan, after the ancient Greek god of the forest. The following year, Richmond issued a correction, as the name he had chosen was itself preoccupied (by the chimpanzees) and erected a new genus Semnornis for the two species.

Historically, the toucan barbet was placed with the other barbets in the large family Capitonidae. This family included African and Asian representatives. DNA studies published in 1994 and 1999 and an examination of the morphology of the family in 1988 found that this arrangement was paraphyletic, as the New World barbets are more closely related to the toucans (family Ramphastidae) than they are to the Old World barbets. In particular, a close phylogenetic relationship between the genus Semnornis (which contains the toucan barbet) and toucans was found. The two lineages were more closely related to each other than even Semnornis and the other New World barbets, a conclusion supported by a 2023 study into the toucans and New World barbets. This led to a breakup of the barbet family, and the separate lineages are now considered to be distinct families; the toucan barbet is, together with the prong-billed barbet, now placed into the family Semnornithidae. An alternative arrangement is to combine all the barbets and the toucans into a single family, which due to priority would be the toucan family Ramphastidae.

The two described subspecies are the nominate race, found in Ecuador, and the subspecies S. r. caucae from Colombia. S. r. caucae, named for Cauca in Colombia, was described in 1941 by Swedish ornithologist and explorer Nils Gyldenstolpe.

== Description ==
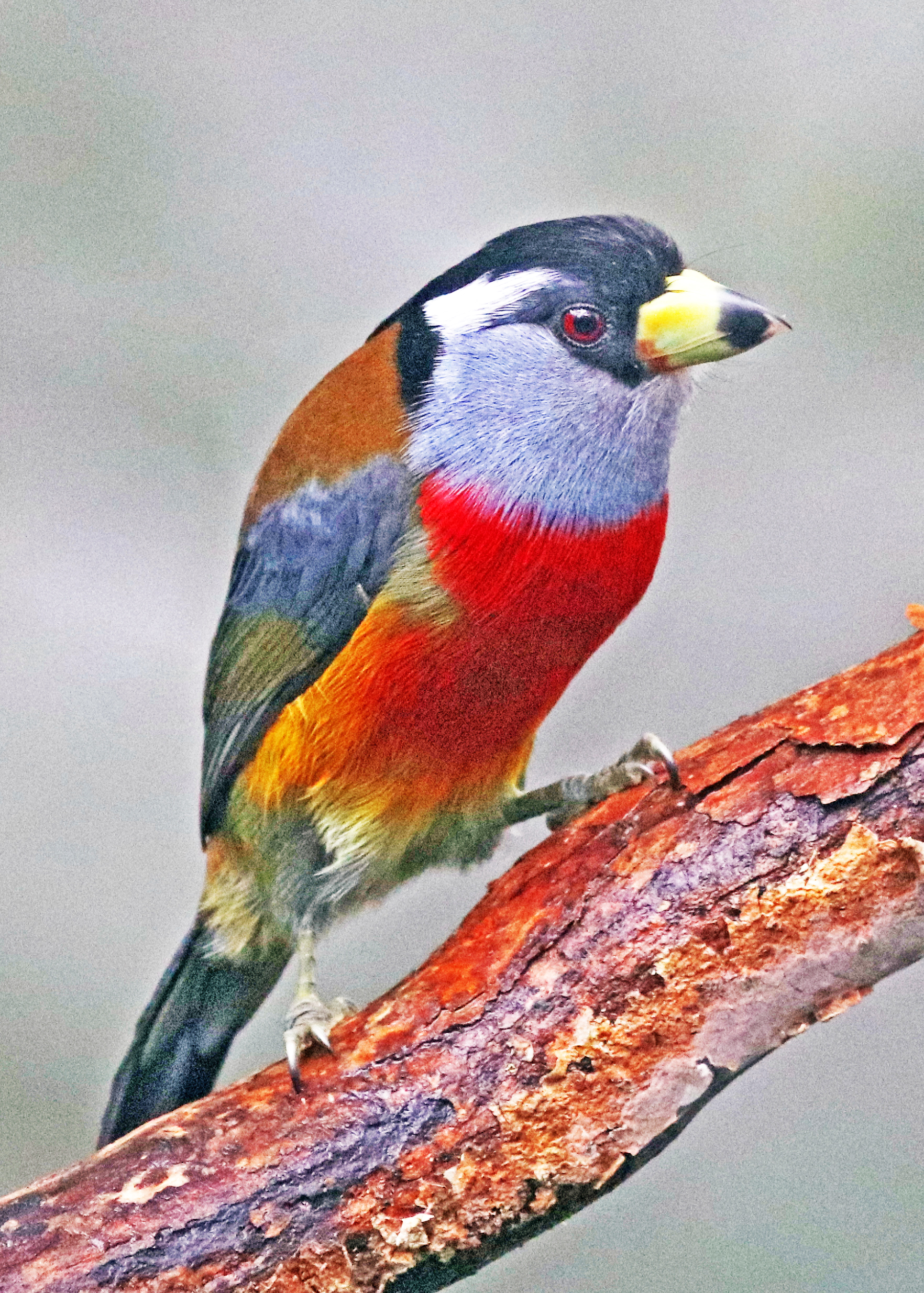
Northwest Ecuador

The toucan barbet is a medium-sized robust barbet, of 19 to 21 cm (7.5–8.3 in) long and weighing 80–115 g (2.8–4.1 oz). The beak is robust with a yellow maxilla and a light green mandible, both with dark ends. It is pronged at the end, though the prongs are not noticeable in the field. The plumage is colourful and includes a black crown, "mask", and thin cervical collar. The species has long occipital feathers and a conspicuous white stripe behind the eyes, which has a bright red-colored iris. The nape of the neck is golden-brown and becomes yellow towards the rump. The throat, upper breast, and sides of the nape are grayish-blue. The lower breast and middle belly are bright red, while the lower belly is yellowish green. The wings and tail are grey. The subspecies S. r. caucae is very similar to the nominate race, but has less extensive red on the breast.

Both sexes are almost identical except for the female's plumage being slightly less bright, and the female lacks the tuft on the black plumage of the nape. Immature birds are duller than adults, and do not develop prongs until they are 4 months old.

== Habitat and distribution ==
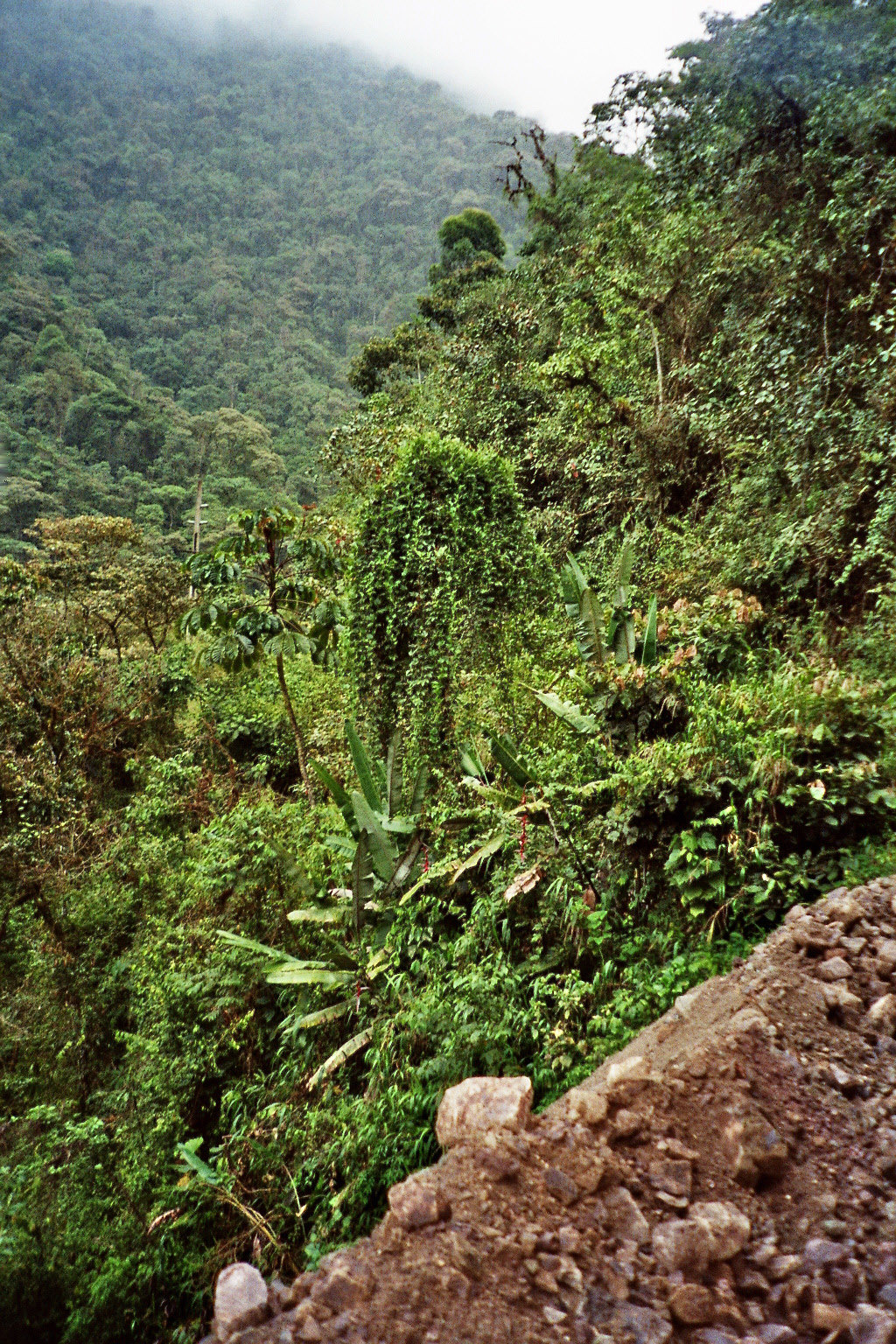
Cloud forest in Ecuador

The species is native to the humid forests of the western Andes, from the Andean slopes of northwest Ecuador to southwest Colombia, at altitudes of 1,400–2,400 m (4,600–7,900 ft). It uses all forest strata, showing some preference for the upper canopy of the forest (11–20 m (36–66 ft)) and the subcanopy (6–10 m (20–33 ft)). The species also uses secondary forest and forest-edge habitats. Evidence suggests that these birds are very specific in choosing trees for nesting. It usually prefers old trees in the family Lauraceae. As nesting trees of sufficient diameter are not very common in these forests, habitat loss through logging is impacting the species.

== Behavior and ecology ==
The toucan barbet is usually found in pairs or small groups perched silently on long horizontal branches, making them hard to find unless active or singing. The flight is characterized by being hurried and noisy. It usually lives in small groups of three to six individuals. The species is territorial, with territories ranging between 4–10.6 ha (9.9–26.2 acres), with an average of 5.8 ha (14 acres). Most of the territory consists of mature forest, although the species can adapt to live in forests with small areas of secondary forest or pastures. Toucan barbet groups show a marked territorial behavior towards other groups or species, which is usually made clear by the loud duets of breeding pairs, and it is actively protected by the breeding pair by chasing of intruders. The family group's helpers assist in this, especially near the nest. In the absence of interference, these groups can occupy a particular territory for a year or longer.

=== Calls and displays ===
Toucan barbet call
Recorded in Ecuador

Toucan barbet calls are unmistakable, composed of loud shrieks that travel long distances. It is usually sung in duet by the breeding pair, simultaneously or in syncope by both sexes during the breeding season, usually for territorial display. The frequency of calls changes with each season, being more common at the beginning of the year and declining in frequency after April. The toucan barbet can also produce clicking sounds.

When nests are threatened by predators or competitor species that might steal the nesting site, members of the group make a rattling call followed by pecking and knocking wood to drive the competitor or predator away. If this fails, the group will begin to mob the intruder. Mobbing behavior is more common if a group is involved as opposed to just a pair.

=== Feeding ===
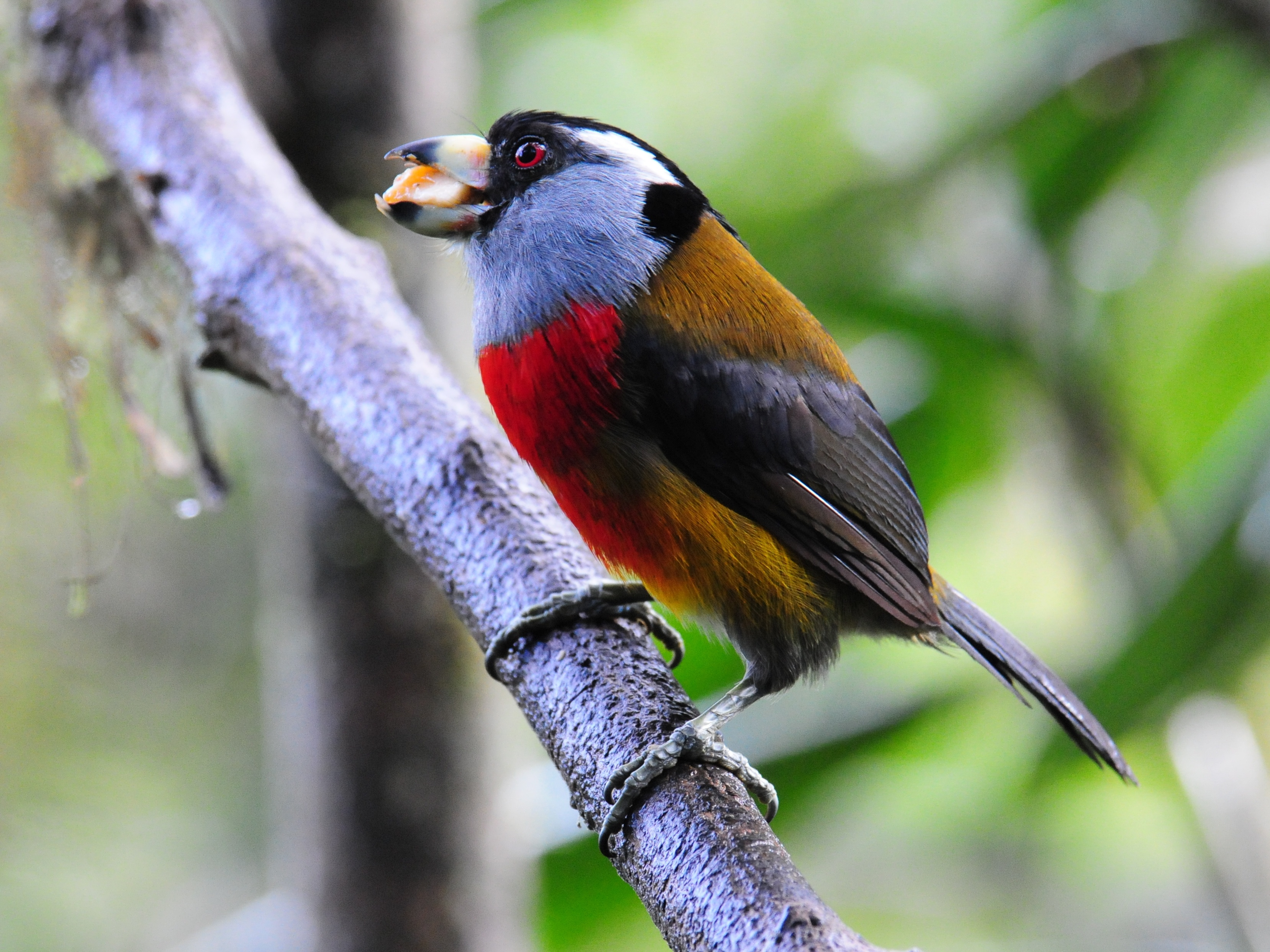
Toucan barbet feeding in Ecuador

The species is frugivorous, feeding on a variety of fruits mixed with other foods. A comparison of the diets of the New World barbets found they were more frugivorous than the other barbets, and their diets were more similar to those of toucans. 62 different species of fruit from 20 families have been reported as being eaten; fruits of Cecropia trees have been shown to be especially important as food sources, as well as Clusia. Other food taken includes insects such as termites, small reptiles, nectar, tree sap, and flower petals. The exact composition of the diet varies by season, with insects being more commonly taken in April. The diet of nestlings has more insect prey than that of adults, with 54% being fruit and 42% being insects.

The toucan barbet forages for 12 hours of the day around its territory, foraging from ground level to 30 m (98 ft) up into the canopy. It forages in small groups of up to six birds and sometimes forms mixed flocks with tyrant flycatchers, warblers, tanagers, and other frugivores.

=== Breeding ===
The toucan barbet is unusual among frugivorous birds in that it breeds cooperatively, with several helpers aiding the dominant breeding pair with incubation and raising the young. Groups are larger outside the reproductive season but generally shrink to three individuals in season, usually composed of previous immature offspring that stay with their parents and help with the new hatchlings. After the breeding season, the group increases due to greater acceptance of non-family members. These helpers significantly increase the reproductive success of the breeding pair. The breeding season of the toucan barbet is from February through to October. Pairs may have two or even three broods per year.

The toucan barbet carves out holes in tree trunks with its powerful beak, in which it roosts and nests. The nesting holes are usually dug into dead trees, usually snags with broken trunks, or more rarely in a dead branch in a living tree. Both sexes incubated the eggs; in nesting sites without helpers, males took more of the incubation and brooding duties than females. The incubation period lasts 15 days, and the hatchlings fledge after 45 days. Juveniles look very much like adults, but have paler colors and black irises. Juveniles' plumage is kept for at least 2 months after fledging.

== Predators and parasites ==
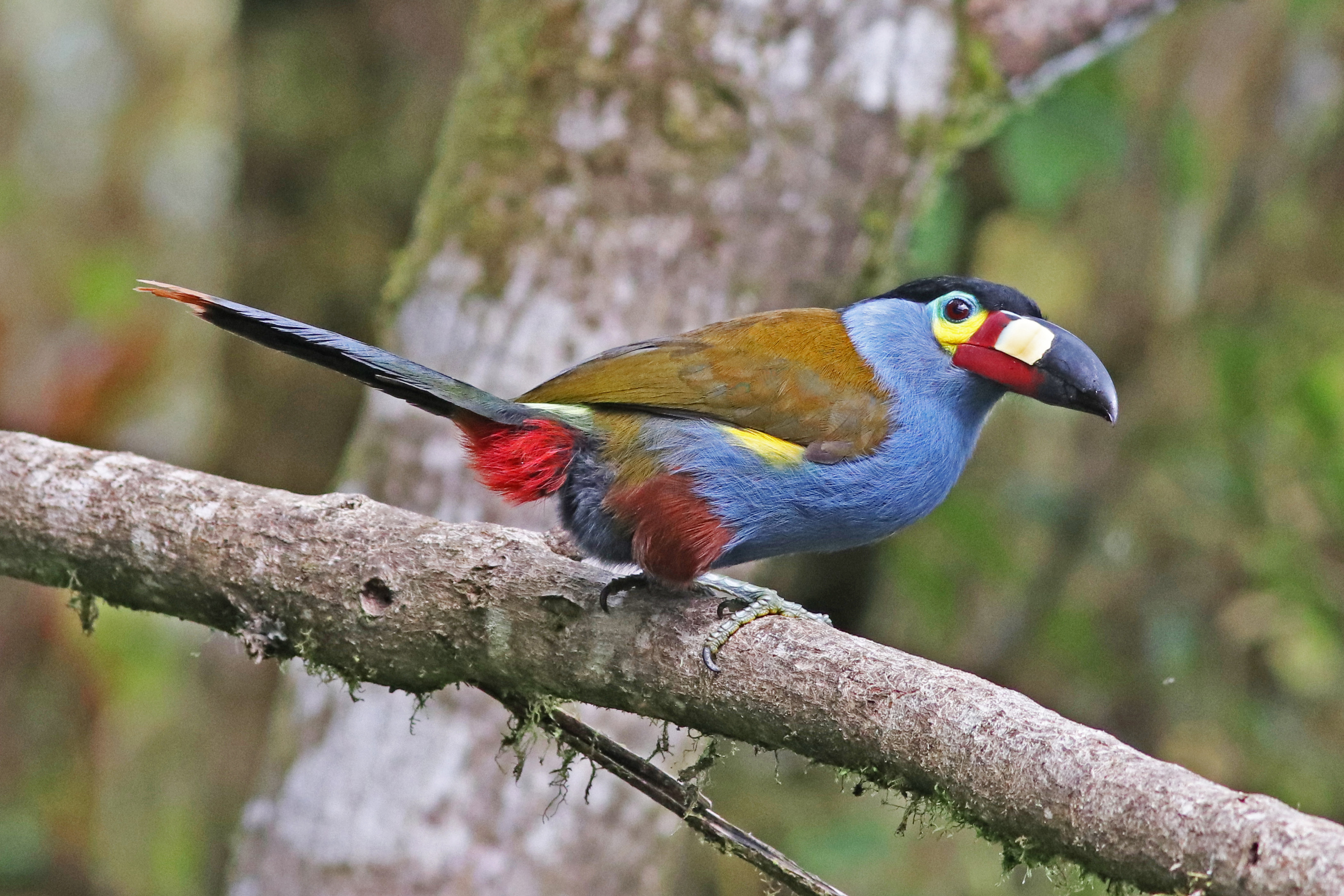
Plate-billed mountain toucans are nest predators of toucan barbets.

The toucan barbet competes with plate-billed mountain toucans for nesting sites, and that species also preys on young toucan barbets in the nest. White-faced capuchins and Neotropical dwarf squirrels are also treated as threats to nesting sites by family groups. Little is known of its parasites, but feather mites of the genera Picalgoides and Ramphastobius (specifically Ramphastobius callinoticus) have been found on them.

== Conservation ==
The species is classified as near threatened by the IUCN. Though still fairly common locally, its populations have decreased due to habitat loss, accelerated by massive logging operations, deforestation, cattle grazing, and mining. Illegal trapping for the local and international cage-bird trade is considered to be the main threat to this species, as it is adaptable and can tolerate some habitat modification if left unmolested. Heavy trapping pressure and habitat fragmentation due to forest clearing are thought to be responsible for some localised extinctions of this species.
