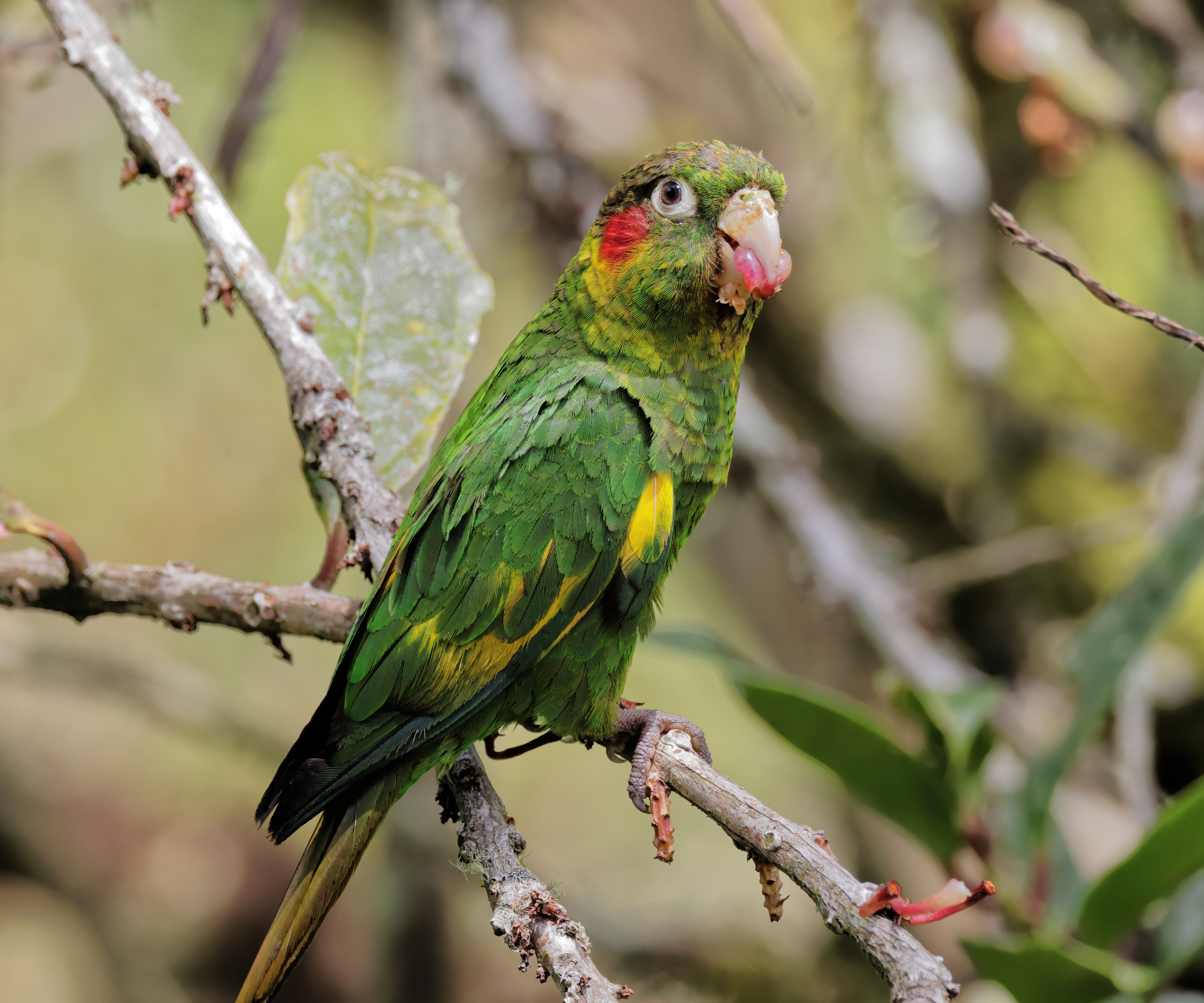
- In Costa Rica

Conservation status
- Least Concern (IUCN 3.1)
- CITES Appendix II

Scientific classification
- Kingdom: Animalia
- Phylum: Chordata
- Class: Aves
- Order: Psittaciformes
- Family: Psittacidae
- Genus: Pyrrhura
- Species: P. hoffmanni

Binomial name
- Pyrrhura hoffmanni (Cabanis, 1861)

= Sulphur-winged parakeet =

Species of bird

The sulphur-winged parakeet (Pyrrhura hoffmanni), also known as Hoffmann's conure in aviculture, is a species of bird in subfamily Arinae of the family Psittacidae, the African and New World parrots. It is found in Costa Rica and Panama.

== Taxonomy and systematics ==
The sulphur-winged parakeet has two subspecies, the nominate P. h. hoffmanni (Cabanis, 1861) and P. h. gaudens (Bangs, 1906).

It is named for the German naturalist Karl Hoffmann.

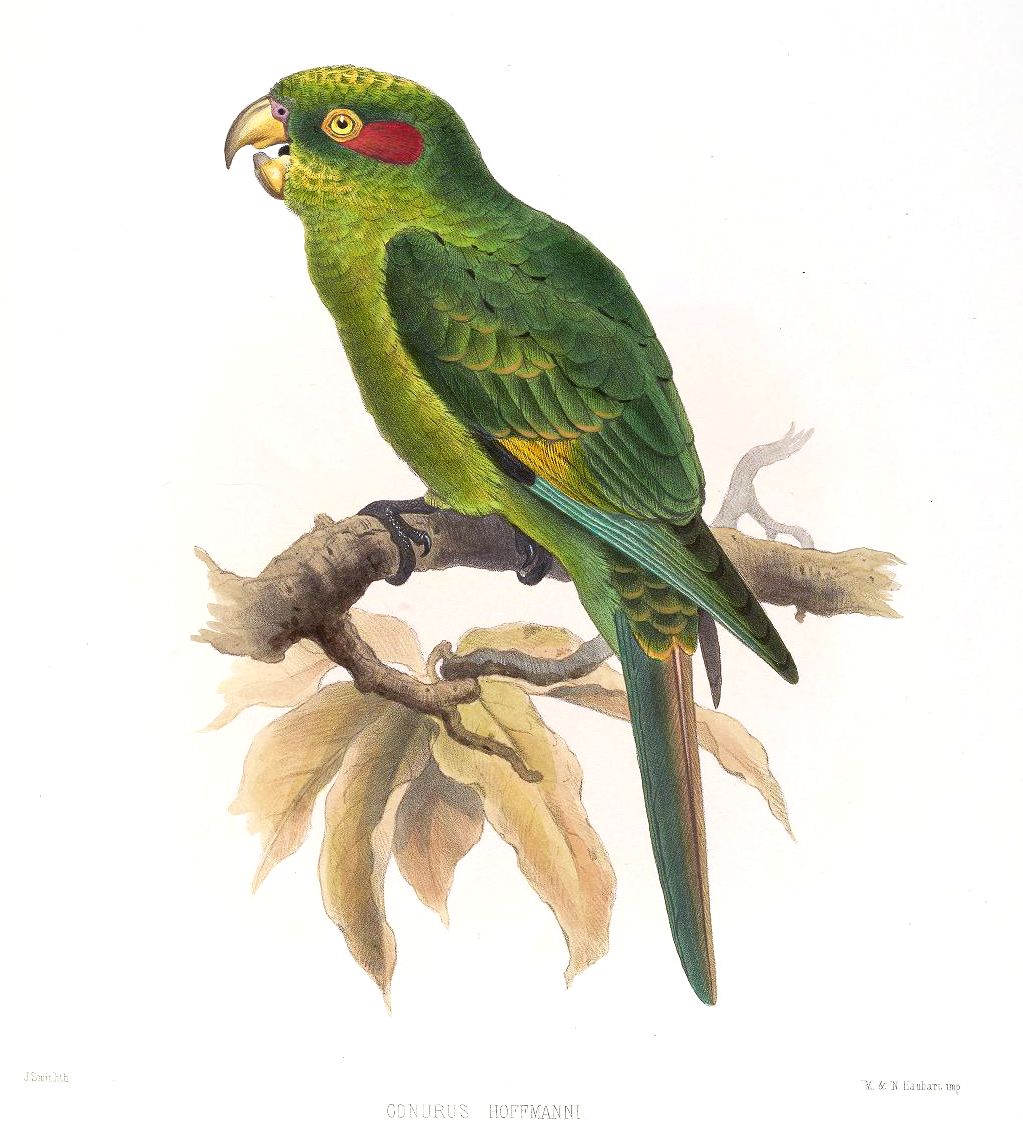
Illustration by Joseph Smit, 1869

== Description ==
The sulphur-winged parakeet is about 23 to 24 cm (9.1 to 9.4 in) long and weighs an average of 82 g (2.9 oz). The sexes are the same. Adults of the nominate subspecies are mostly green. Their head, nape, and throat have some yellow inclusions; bare white skin surrounds their eye and their ear coverts are bright terracotta. Their breast has a dull orange wash. Their wing is mostly green with yellow primary coverts, inner primaries, and outer secondaries; the outer primaries are blue. Their tail's upperside is rufous olive with green fringes on the feathers; its underside is reddish brown. Immature birds have duller scaling, less orange on their breast, and much less yellow on their wings. Subspecies P. h. gaudens has some orange-red markings on its head and its underparts are slightly darker than those of the nominate.

== Distribution and habitat ==
The nominate subspecies of the sulphur-winged parakeet is found in the Cordillera de Talamanca and the Dota region of southern Costa Rica. P. h. gaudens is found in western Panama as far east as Veraguas Province. The species inhabits primary and logged montane forest and adjacent shrubby areas and secondary forest. In elevation it ranges from 700 to 3,000 m (2,300 to 9,800 ft) but usually occurs above 1,600 m (5,200 ft).

== Behavior ==
=== Movement ===
The sulphur-winged parakeet moves from the upper elevations to the lower during the wet season, and sometimes makes daily elevational moves between roosting and feeding sites.

=== Feeding ===
The sulphur-winged parakeet typically forages in small flocks in the forest canopy. Its diet is primarily the fruits and seeds of a variety of plants and trees.

=== Breeding ===
The sulphur-winged parakeet is believed to nest mainly between January and June. It nests in a natural tree cavity or old woodpecker hole, typically between 8 and 20 m (25 and 65 ft) above the ground. In captivity the clutch size is six eggs, the incubation period 24 days, and fledging 10 weeks after hatch.

=== Vocalization ===
The sulphur-winged parakeet's most common call is "a series of high-pitched shrill notes, e.g. "krree krree krree" " that is given both from a perch and in flight. It is shrill but not screechy in contrast to that of other Pyrrhura parakeets. Perched birds are often silent. Flocks in flight "call frequently and simultaneously, producing a noisy, harsh and piercing chattering."

== Status ==
The IUCN has assessed the sulphur-winged parakeet as being of Least Concern. Though it has a fairly small range, it has an estimated population of 20,000 to 50,000 mature individuals that is believed to be stable. No immediate threats have been identified. It is "[f]airly common to common within its small range, and tolerant of substantial habitat modification" and little affected by the pet trade.
