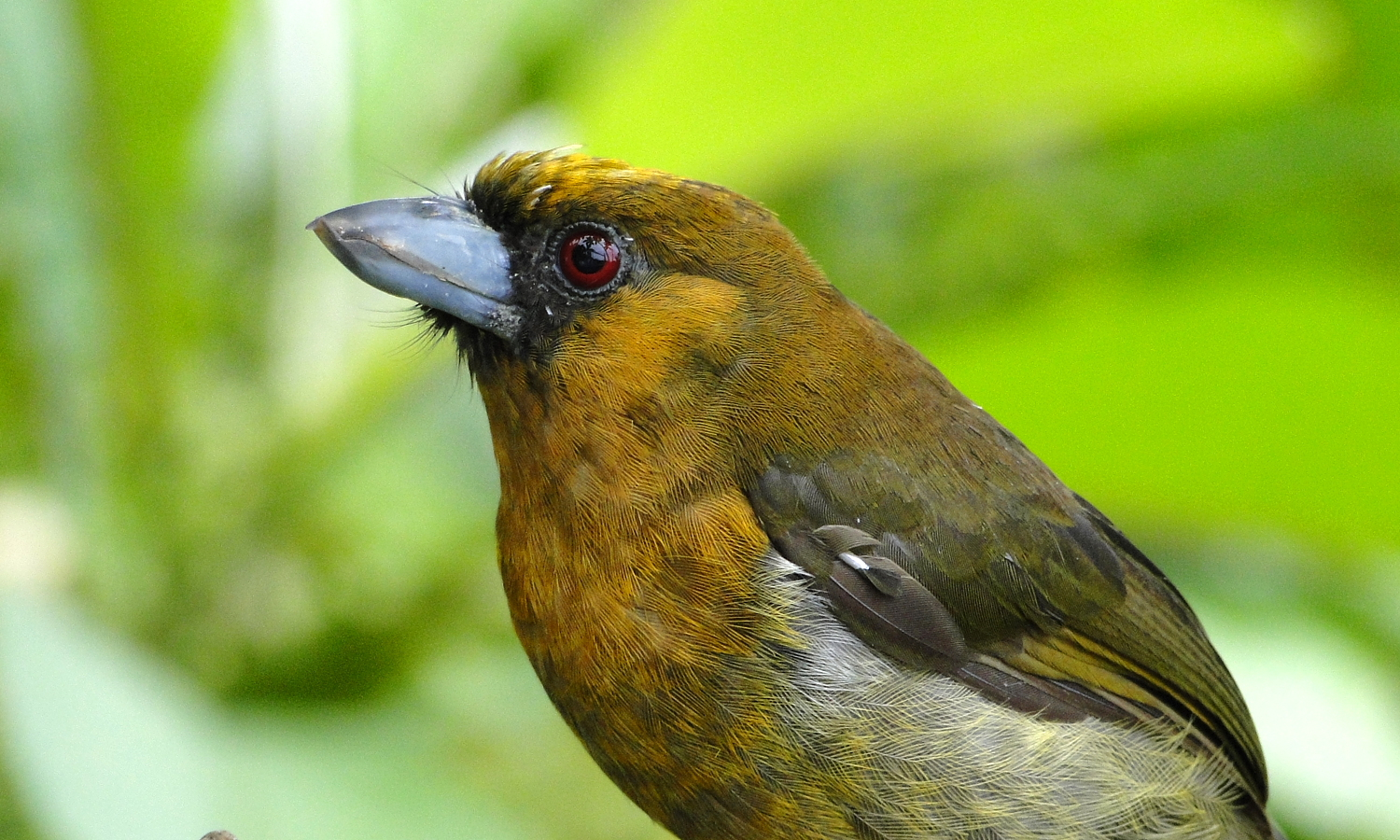

Conservation status
- Least Concern (IUCN 3.1)

Scientific classification
- Kingdom: Animalia
- Phylum: Chordata
- Class: Aves
- Order: Piciformes
- Family: Semnornithidae
- Genus: Semnornis
- Species: S. frantzii

Binomial name
- Semnornis frantzii (Sclater, PL, 1864)

= Prong-billed barbet =

Species of bird

The prong-billed barbet (Semnornis frantzii) is a distinctive, relatively large-billed bird native to humid highland forest of Costa Rica and western Panama.

== Taxonomy and systematics ==
The prong-billed barbet was traditionally placed in family Capitonidae sensu lato with both Neotropic and Old World barbets. However, morphological, hybridization, and DNA studies have confirmed that this arrangement is paraphyletic; New World barbets are more closely related to toucans than they are to Old World barbets. Therefore New World (Capitonidae sensu stricto), African (Lybiidae), and Asian (Megalaimidae) barbets were each accorded their own families. The prong-billed barbet and the toucan barbet (Semnornis ramphastinus) were placed in the new family Semnornithidae.

The prong-billed barbet is monotypic. Its specific epithet commemorates the German naturalist Alexander von Frantzius.

== Description ==
The prong-billed barbet is 17 to 18.5 cm (6.7 to 7.3 in) long and weighs about 60 to 70 g (2.1 to 2.5 oz). Its bill is silvery gray to bluish with a dark tip; a notch on the tip of the mandible provides its English name. The maxilla has a hooked tip and a notch on the side. Adults have a dull golden brown crown, brownish olive nape and upper back, and olive green lower back, rump, and uppertail coverts. Males have a glossy black tuft of feathers at the rear of the crown; females lack it. Both sexes have dull slaty black lores, cheeks, and chin. The sides of their head, their neck, and their upper breast are buffy olive that becomes yellowish on the lower breast. Their belly's center is pale yellow and their flanks dull grayish with a pale yellowish wash. Their tail is dull green and their wings dusky. Immatures are overall duller than adults and the black areas of the adult's face are grayer in immatures.

== Distribution and habitat ==
The prong-billed barbet is found in the mountains from Costa Rica's Cordillera de Tilarán to western Panama's Veraguas Province. In elevation it mostly ranges between 750 and 2,450 m (2,500 and 8,000 ft) on the Caribbean side of Costa Rica, between 1,500 and 1,450 m (4,900 and 4,800 ft) on the Pacific side, and between 1,500 and 2,250 m (4,900 and 7,400 ft) in Panama. (Locally it occurs somewhat lower in both countries.) It inhabits the interior and edges of extremely humid montane evergreen forest, a landscape characterized by many epiphytes and mosses and frequent fog.

== Behavior ==
=== Movement ===
The prong-billed barbet is non-migratory.

=== Social interaction ===
In the non-breeding season prong-billed barbets forage in flocks of up to 12 individuals, and roost communally in tree cavities with up to 16 in close association.

=== Feeding ===
Prong-billed barbets usually forage in the forest canopy but sometimes do so lower at the edges. Their diet is almost entirely fruit, but young nestlings are fed insects. Small fruits are swallowed whole or only the interior may be squeezed out. Large fruits are torn apart to eat.

=== Breeding ===
Prong-billed barbets are monogamous and territorial in the breeding season. Their breeding season begins when pairs court in March and they begin excavating nest cavities in trees about in mid-month. Cavities are sited between 3 and 18 m (10 and 60 ft) above ground. The clutch size is four or five. The incubation period is 14 to 15 days; the time from hatch to fledging is not known. Both parents incubate the eggs and care for nestlings and fledglings.

=== Vocalization ===
The prong-billed barbet's song has been described as "a deep cwa-cwa-cwa-cwa...repeated many times" and as "a resonant, far-carrying, rather throaty cwa-cwa-cwa-cwa". Both sexes sing, frequently in duet, and also in a "chorus" by several birds. The species has a variety of calls including "low, dry rattling notes", " a nasal, squalling kwaaaah, and "a skurr; bark-like chuk notes; and an alarm cackle."

== Status ==
The IUCN has assessed the prong-billed barbet as being of Least Concern. It has a small range, but its estimated population of between 20,000 and 50,000 mature individuals is believed to be stable. No immediate threats have been identified. "It is common within its range...and occurs in several parks and reserves in Costa Rica."
