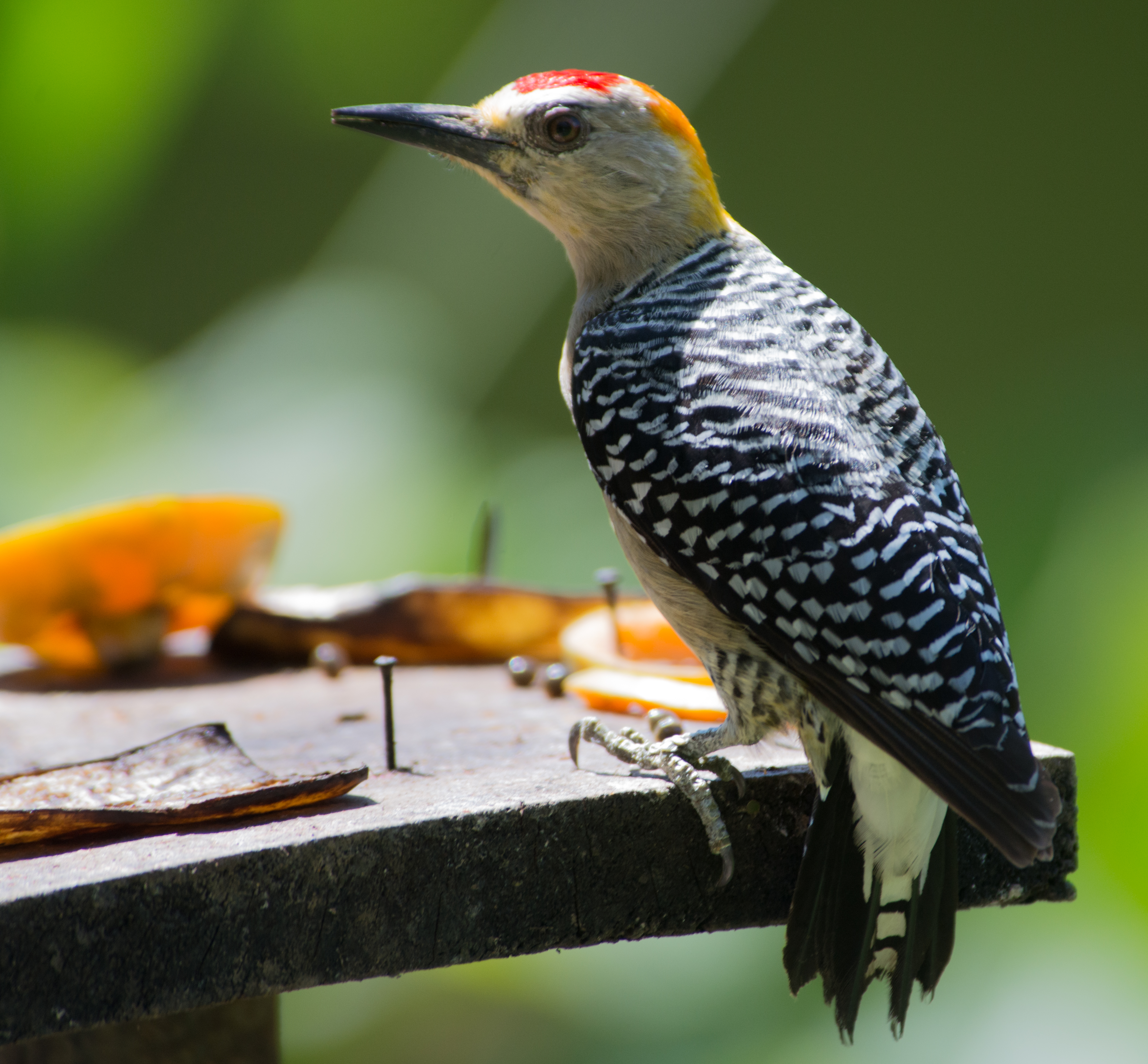

Conservation status
- Least Concern (IUCN 3.1)

Scientific classification
- Kingdom: Animalia
- Phylum: Chordata
- Class: Aves
- Order: Piciformes
- Family: Picidae
- Genus: Melanerpes
- Species: M. hoffmannii

Binomial name
- Melanerpes hoffmannii (Cabanis, 1862)

= Hoffmann's woodpecker =

Species of bird

Hoffmann's woodpecker (Melanerpes hoffmannii) is a species of bird in subfamily Picinae of the woodpecker family Picidae. It is found from Honduras south to Costa Rica.

== Taxonomy and systematics ==
Hoffmann's woodpecker was originally described in genus Centurus. Some authors have treated it as a subspecies of the golden-fronted woodpecker (M. aurifrons), and the two hybridize in the north of Hoffmann's range. Hoffmann's also hybridizes with the red-crowned woodpecker (M. rubricapilus) in the south.

Hoffmann's woodpecker is monotypic.

The species is named for the German naturalist Karl Hoffmann.

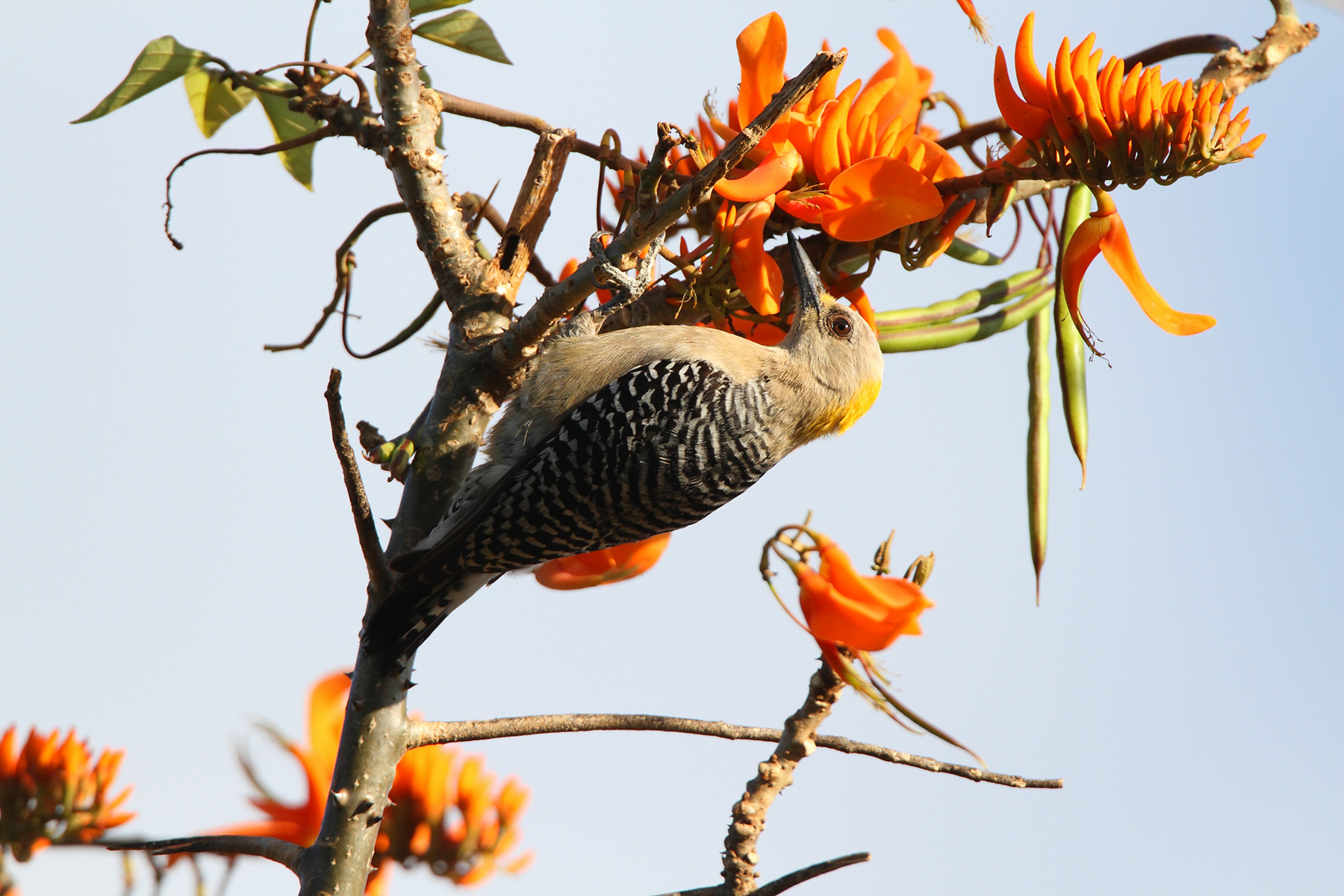
Female, Alajuela, Costa Rica

== Description ==
Hoffmann's woodpecker is 18 to 21 cm (7.1 to 8.3 in) long and weighs 62 to 84 g (2.2 to 3.0 oz). The sexes' plumage is alike except for their head pattern. Adult males have a dull white forecrown and supercilium, a bright red crown, and a bright yellow or orange nape. Adult females have a dull white crown and a pale yellow nape. Both sexes' faces and the sides of their throat are drab yellowish gray. Their back and upper rump are barred black and white and the lower rump and uppertail coverts are unbarred white. Their flight feathers are black with white bars throughout and some white spots. Their tail is black with some white on most of the feathers. The sides of their throat and breast are drab yellowish gray, their chin, throat, and breast are dull grayish to yellowish white, and their central belly is bright yellow. Their flanks and undertail coverts are dull yellowish white with black bars. Their bill is black, their iris hazel, and their legs bluish gray to gray.

== Distribution and habitat ==
Hoffmann's woodpecker is found from southwestern Honduras' Choluteca Department through Nicaragua on the Pacific slope to central Costa Rica. There is also one record from El Salvador. The species inhabits dry and deciduous forests and more open areas such as shade coffee plantations, urban parks, and house gardens. In elevation it ranges from sea level to 400 m (1,300 ft) in Honduras, to 800 m (2,600 ft) in Nicaragua, and to more than 2,100 m (6,900 ft) in Costa Rica.

== Behavior ==
=== Movement ===
Hoffmann's woodpecker is a year-round resident throughout its range.

=== Feeding ===
Hoffmann's woodpecker typically forages from the forest understory to its canopy, though it has been observed feeding on the ground. Its diet is mostly arthropods that it extracts from decaying trunks and branches. It also feeds on a variety of fruits and takes nectar from large flowers. It occasionally eats the eggs of other birds.

=== Breeding ===
The breeding season of Hoffmann's woodpecker spans at least from January to July and typically two broods are raised. Both sexes excavate the nest cavity in soft dead wood, living palms, or fence posts. The cavity is typically between 1 and 6 m (3 and 20 ft) above the ground, and both sexes aggressively defend it from other Hoffmann's woodpeckers and tityras. The clutch size is two or three eggs. Both parents incubate the clutch and provision nestlings. The incubation period and time to fledging are not known.

=== Vocal and non-vocal sounds ===
The most common Hoffmann's woodpecker call is "churrr", made by both sexes. They also make "a querulous, grating, woick-a woick-a woick-a... or wicka wicka wicka." The species usually drums on dead wood but has been observed drumming on metal structures.

== Status ==
The IUCN has assessed Hoffmann's woodpecker as being of Least Concern. It has a large range and its estimated population of at least 50,000 mature individuals is believed to be increasing. No immediate threats have been identified. It has "increased its distribution in recent years due in part to deforestation following growing human colonization" but "[e]limination of dead trees...negatively affects the population of this species, by limit[ing] the nesting substrates."
