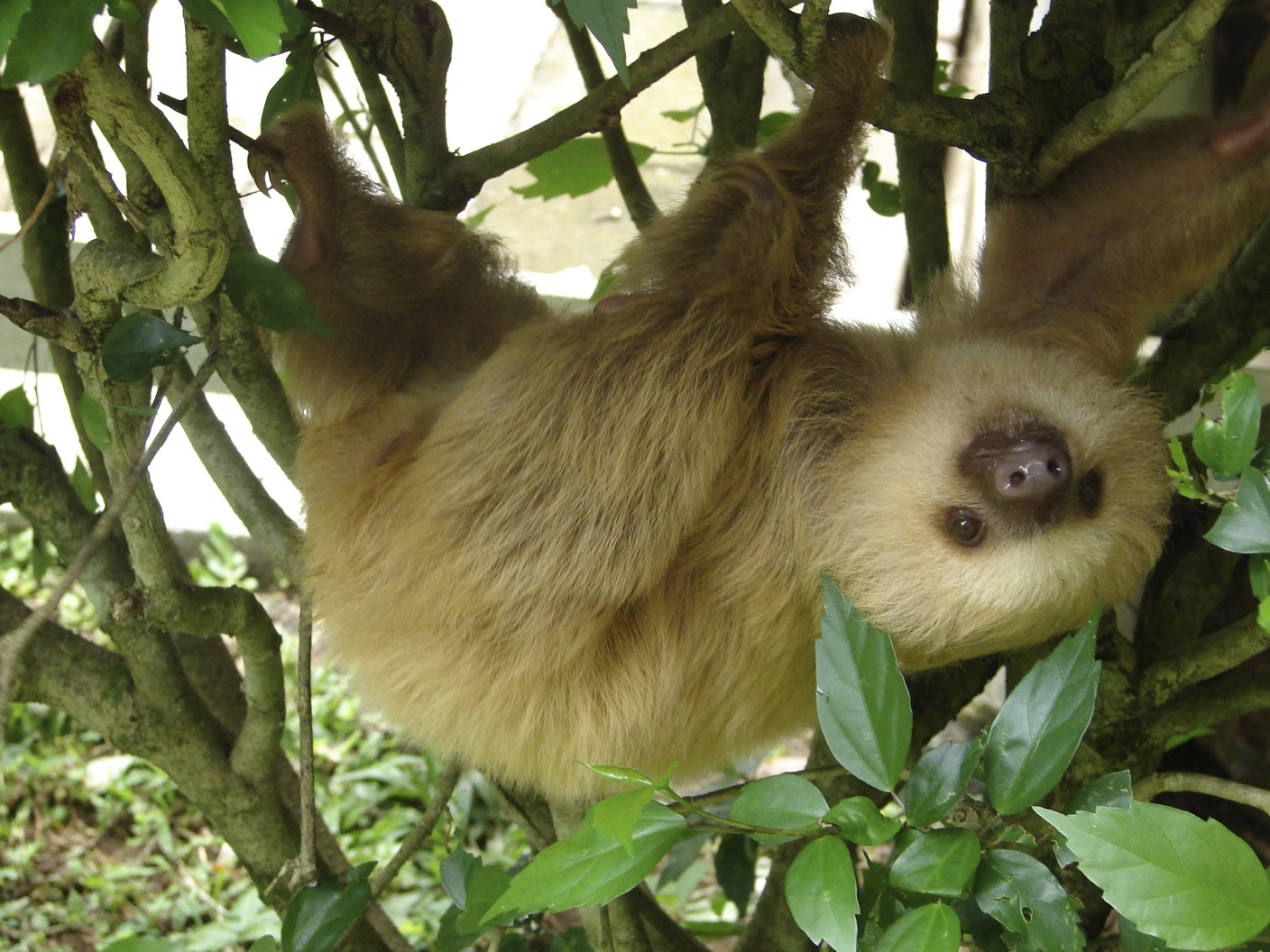

Conservation status
- Least Concern (IUCN 3.1)

Scientific classification
- Kingdom: Animalia
- Phylum: Chordata
- Class: Mammalia
- Infraclass: Placentalia
- Order: Pilosa
- Suborder: Folivora
- Family: Choloepodidae
- Genus: Choloepus
- Species: C. hoffmanni

Binomial name
- Choloepus hoffmanni Peters, 1858
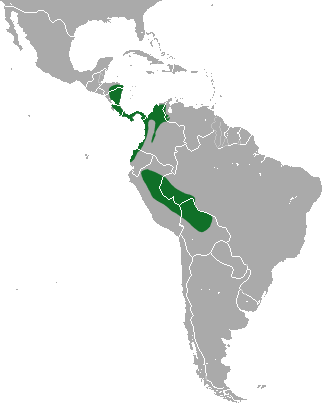
- Hoffmann's two-toed sloth range

= Hoffmann's two-toed sloth =

Species of pilosan mammal

Hoffmann's two-toed sloth climbing in a cage at Ueno Zoo (video)

The Hoffmann's two-toed sloth (Choloepus hoffmanni), also known as the northern two-toed sloth, is a species of sloth from Central and South America. It is a solitary, largely nocturnal and arboreal animal, found in mature and secondary rainforests and deciduous forests. The common name commemorates the German naturalist Karl Hoffmann, who discovered the Hoffmann sloth.

== Description ==
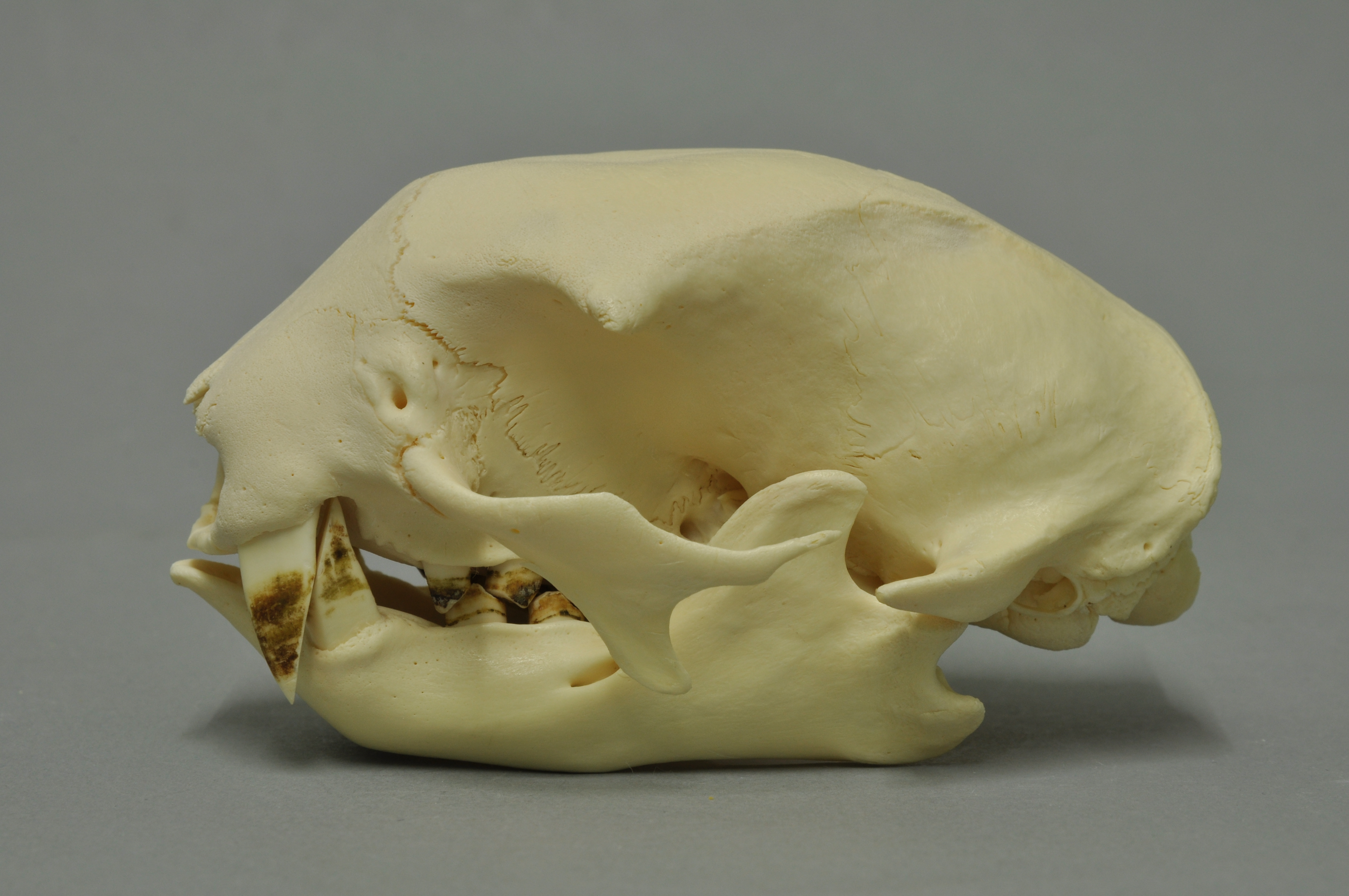
Skull of a Hoffmann's two-toed sloth

Hoffmann's two-toed sloth is a heavily built animal with shaggy fur and slow, deliberate movements. The fore feet have only two toes, each ending with long, curved claws, although three clawed toes are on each of the hind feet. Other features that distinguish it from three-toed sloths, which may be found in the same geographic areas, include the longer snout, separate rather than partially fused toes of the forefeet, the absence of hair on the soles of the feet, fewer dark markings around the eyes, and larger overall size. The wrist of the sloth has developed some specific traits due to their slow, yet acrobatic motions. These evolved traits include diminution and distal migration of the pisiform bone, with a loss of contact with the ulna; reduction of the distal end of the ulna to a styloid process; and extremely reduced contact between the ulna and triquetral bone.

Hoffmann's two-toed sloth is, however, much easier to confuse with the related Linnaeus's two-toed sloth, which it closely resembles. The primary physical differences between the two species relate to subtle skeletal features; for example, Hoffmann's two-toed sloth has three foramina in the upper forward part of the interpterygoid space, rather than just two, and often – but not always – has fewer cervical vertebrae.

Adults range from 54 to 72 cm (21 to 28 in) in head-body length, and weigh from 2.1 to 9 kg (4.6 to 19.8 lb). Although they do have stubby tails, just 1.5 to 3 cm (0.59 to 1.18 in) long, this is too short to be visible through the long fur. The claws are 5 to 6.5 cm (2.0 to 2.6 in) long. Females are larger on average than males, although with considerable overlap in size. Their fur is tan to light brown in colour, being lighter on the face, but usually has a greenish tinge because of the presence of algae living in the hairs.

Its karyotype has 2n = 49–51 and FN = 61.

== Distribution and habitat ==
Hoffmann's two-toed sloth inhabits tropical forests from sea level to 3,300 m (10,800 ft) above sea level. It is found in the rainforest canopy in two separate regions of Central and South America, separated by the Andes. One population is found from eastern Honduras in the north to western Ecuador in the south, and the other in eastern Peru, western Brazil, and northern Bolivia. Based on cytochrome c oxidase subunit I sequences, a divergence date of about 7 million years between these populations has been suggested. Two-toed sloths live in the canopies in the forests of the tropical rainforests. They usually tend to be relaxing in the branches of the trees that are intertwined within each other throughout the sheltering treetops. Most of the two-toed sloths activity takes place hanging upside down but when it comes time for urination and defecation they make their way to the ground. These creatures also come to the ground when in need of a new tree to live upon or to discover a new food source.

Hoffmann's two-toed sloth inhabits a range of different trees within its habitat, although it seems to prefer those with plentiful lianas and direct sunlight. They have a typical home range of about 2 to 4 ha (4.9 to 9.9 acres), and may spend most of their lives travelling between just 25 or so trees.

=== Subspecies ===
The five recognised subspecies of C. hoffmanni are:

- C. h. hoffmanni, Peters, 1858 – Honduras, Nicaragua, Costa Rica, Panama
- C. h. agustinus, Allen, 1913 – Venezuela, western Colombia, northern Ecuador
- C. h. capitalis, Allen, 1913 – western Ecuador
- C. h. juruanus, Lönnberg, 1942 – Brazil, Bolivia, extreme eastern Peru
- C. h. pallescens, Lönnberg, 1928 – Peru

== Behavior ==
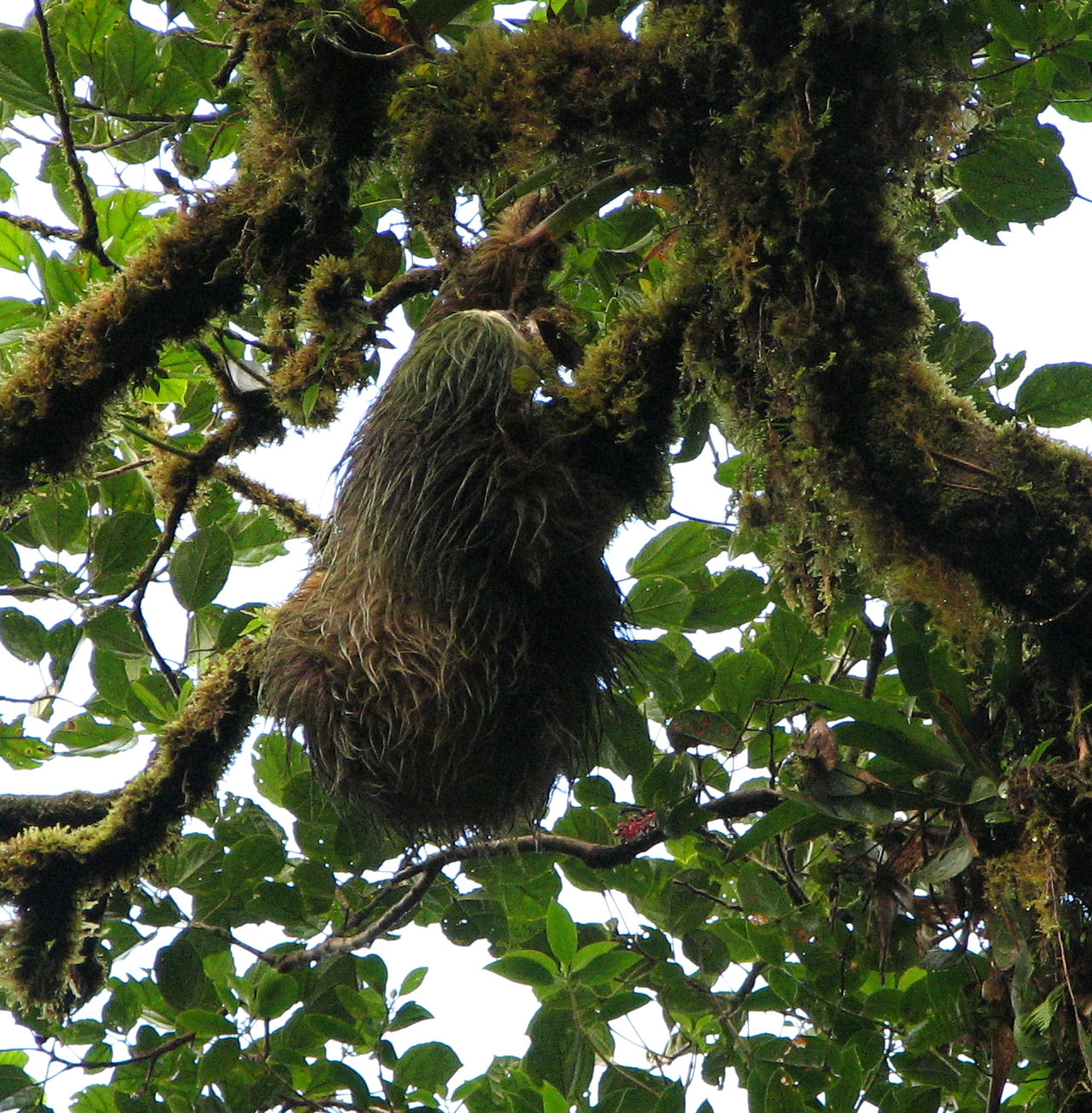
C. h. hoffmanni, high in Monteverde canopy

Two-toed sloths spend most of their time in trees, though they may travel on the ground to move to a new tree. A study of sloths on Barro Colorado Island indicated that the Hoffmann's two-toed sloths there were almost exclusively nocturnal, even though in other locations they are known to be active during day. The authors attributed this in part to competition with the brown-throated sloth. They often move slowly through the canopy for about eight hours each night, and spend much of the day sleeping in tangles of lianas. They move only very slowly, typically at around 0.14 m/s (0.46 ft/s), although they can move up to 50% faster when excited. They are solitary in the wild, and, aside from mothers with young, it is unusual for two to be found in a tree at the same time.

The name "sloth" means "lazy", but the slow movements of this animal are actually an adaptation for surviving on a low-energy diet of leaves. These sloths have half the metabolic rate of a typical mammal of the same size. Despite their low metabolic rates, two-toed sloths physiologically respond to hypoxia and hypercapnia similarly to other mammals with higher metabolic rates. Sloths also have very poor eyesight, caused by a genetic disorder known as rod monochromacy. This causes them to be fully colorblind and almost completely blind at night, due to a lack of ciliary muscle, ganglion cells, and slender optic nerves around the eyes. All of these parts work together to send visual information to the brain, and are hindered in sloths which causes their poor eyesight. As a result, sloths rely almost entirely on their senses of touch and smell to find food.

Two-toed sloths hang from tree branches, suspended by their huge, hook-like claws. The clinging behaviour is a reflex action, and sloths are found still hanging from trees after they die. The sloth spends almost its entire life, including eating, sleeping, mating, and giving birth, hanging upside down from tree branches. Usually, sloths are found right side up when they descend to the ground to defecate, which they usually do about once every three to eight days. They will also ground themselves to urinate, change trees if they wish, or mate, as well as give birth. While terrestrial locomotion is usually thought to involve the sloth lying on the ground and pulling themselves forward, they have actually been seen walking on their palms and soles.

Sloths descend about once every eight days to defecate on the ground. The reason and mechanism behind this behavior have long been debated among scientists. There are at least five hypotheses:

1. fertilize trees when feces are deposited at the base of the tree;
2. cover feces and avoid predation;
3. chemical communication between individuals;
4. pick up trace nutrients in their claws, that are then ingested
5. favor a mutualistic relationship with populations of fur moths.

More recently, a new hypothesis has emerged, which presents evidence against the previous ones and proposes that all current sloths are descendants from species that defecated on the ground, and there simply has not been enough selective pressure to abandon this behavior, since cases of predation during defecation are actually very rare.

Sloths have many predators, including the jaguars, cougars, ocelots, harpy eagles, margays, and anacondas. There have also been increased rates of attack on Hoffmann sloths by domestic dogs, particularly in arboreal areas that are in the process of development and urbanization. If threatened, sloths can defend themselves by slashing out at a predator with their huge claws or biting with their canines. However, a sloth's main defense is to avoid being attacked in the first place. The two-toed sloth can survive wounds that would be fatal to another mammal its size. The sloth's slow, deliberate movements and algae-covered fur make them difficult for predators to spot from a distance. Their treetop homes are also out of reach for many larger predators.

Their long, coarse fur also protects them from sun and rain. Their fur, unlike other mammals, flows from belly to top, not top to belly, allowing rainwater to slide off the fur while the animal is hanging upside down.

== Diet ==
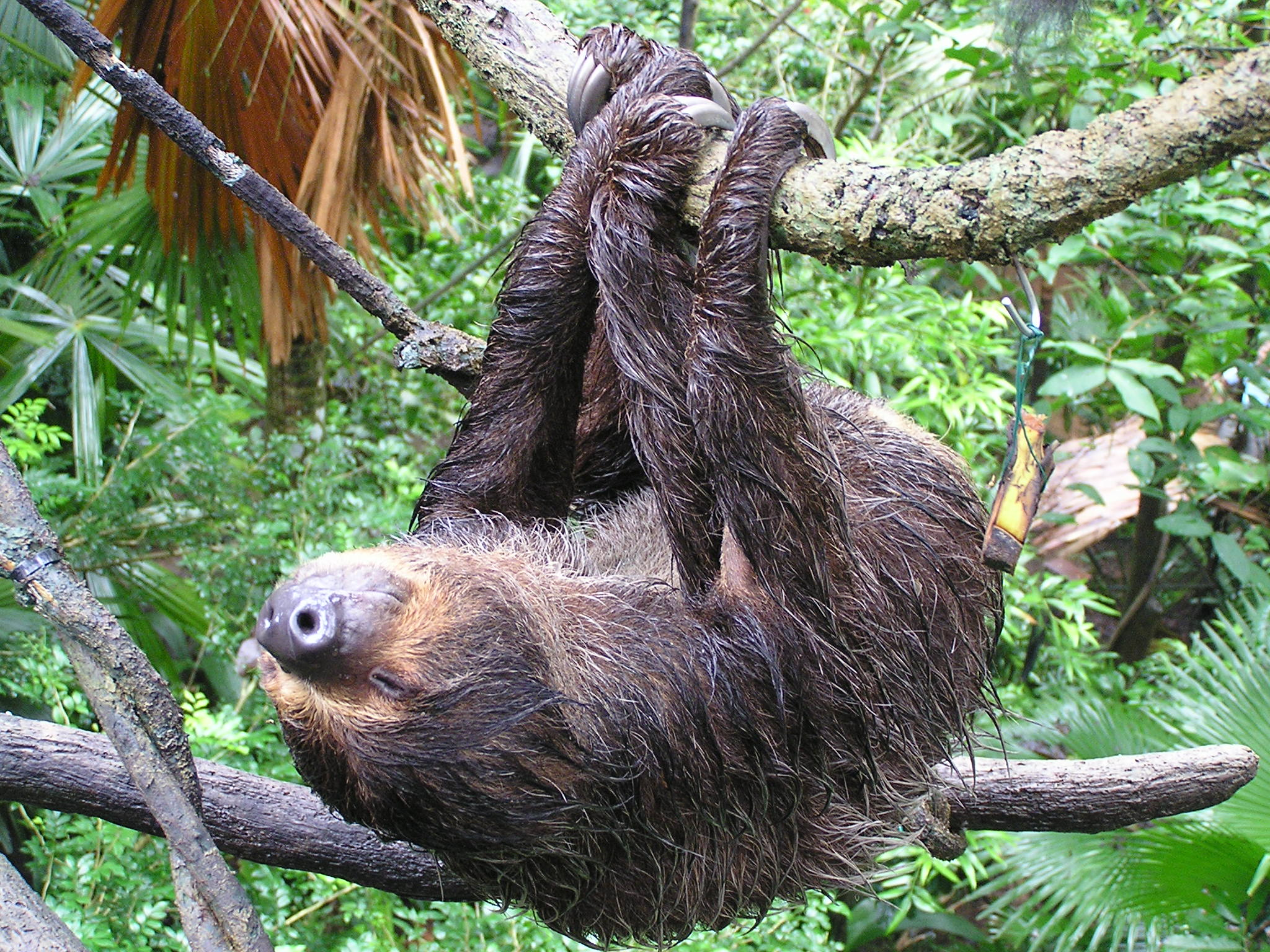
Suspended from a branch

Though two-toed sloths also eat buds, tender twigs, young plant shoots, fruits and flowers, most of their diets consist of tree leaves. Two-toed sloths tend to eat younger leaves due to their higher nutritional content and easy digestibility in comparison with older leaves. They use their lips to tear off their food and chew with their peg-like teeth which have no enamel and are always growing. Additionally, they have been observed using mineral licks, which can provide them with essential nutrients.

Due to their low concentrations of 7-dehydrocholesterol, it is believed that two-toed sloths cannot synthesize vitamin D through skin contact with sunlight. They make up for this lack of synthesis through their diet.

Although they are not true ruminants, sloths have three-chambered stomachs. The first two chambers hold symbiotic bacteria to help them digest the cellulose in their fibre-rich diets, while only the third chamber contains digestive glands typical of the stomachs of most other mammals. A sloth may take up to a month to completely digest a meal, and up to two-thirds of a sloth's weight may be the leaves in its digestive system.

== Reproduction ==
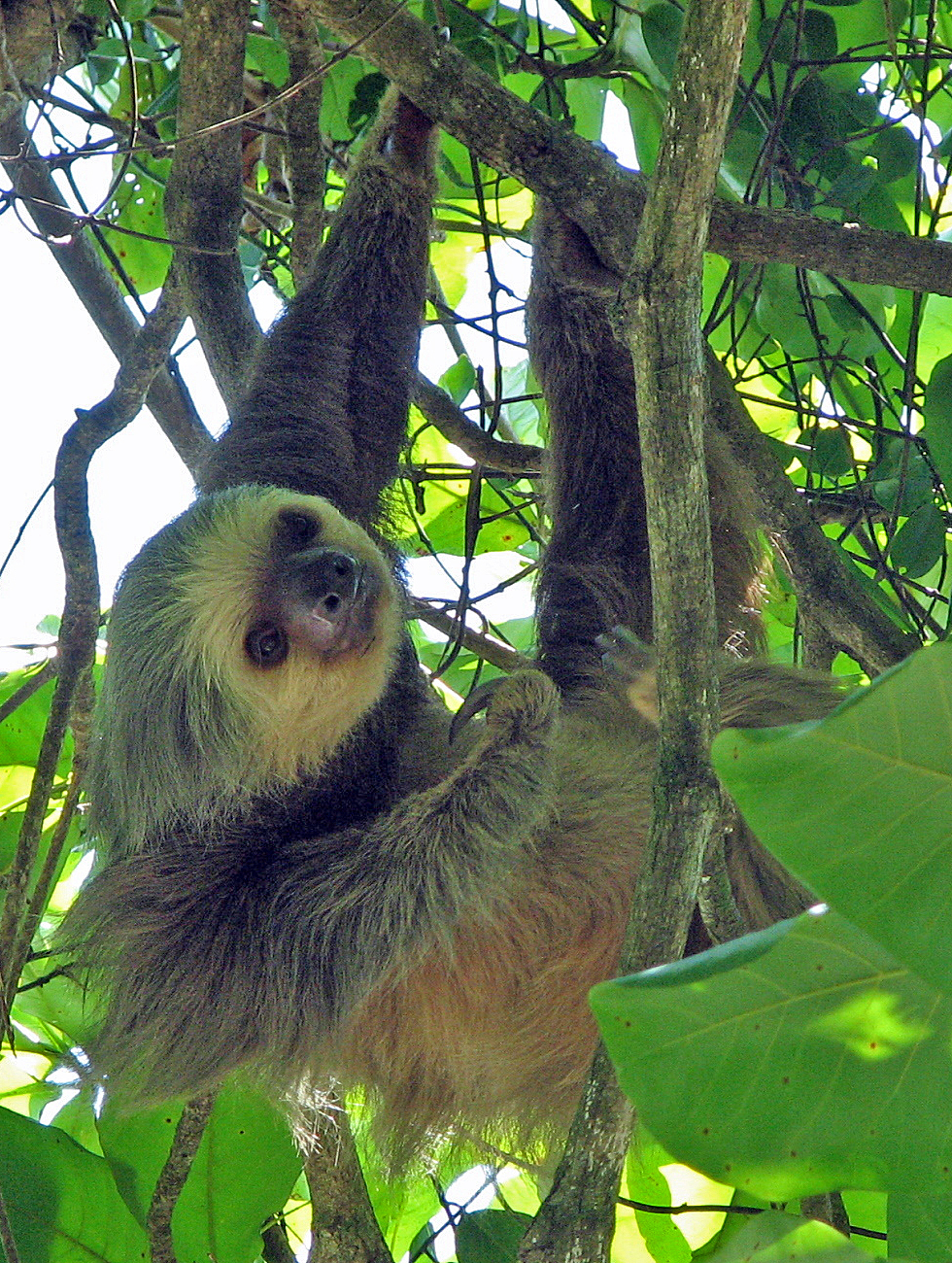
In Manuel Antonio National Park, Costa Rica

The reproduction process of the two-toed sloths has some differences when compared to the three-toed sloths. Two toed sloths tend to mate all year around; they do not really go by a schedule. Courtship consists of the female licking the male's face and rubbing her genitals against the male's body. Gestation lasts between 355 and 377 days, and results in the birth of a single young. Typically, mating occurs during the rainy season and birth during the dry season. The female carries the baby for typically 11.5 months. Sloths do not tend to have one life long breeding partner. When the females are ready to mate, they let out a loud scream which attracts the males; if numerous males are ready to mate, they fight each other; after done mating, the male will usually leave. Males distribute anal secretions on tree branches as scent markings to signal their presence to females. One factor that might explain this difference is that in some places, female sloths congregate around small, heterogeneously distributed habitats, allowing dominant males to gain mating access with multiple females with relatively little risk and effort. Territories of male Hoffman's sloths typically overlap with each other and surround about three females per male sloth, allowing them to have multiple female partners. In some cases, Hoffman's sloths mate polygynously, in which their defined territories limit the females they breed with. But at other times, these sloths mate promiscuously, based on instances when two sloths are near each other and the opportunity presents itself.

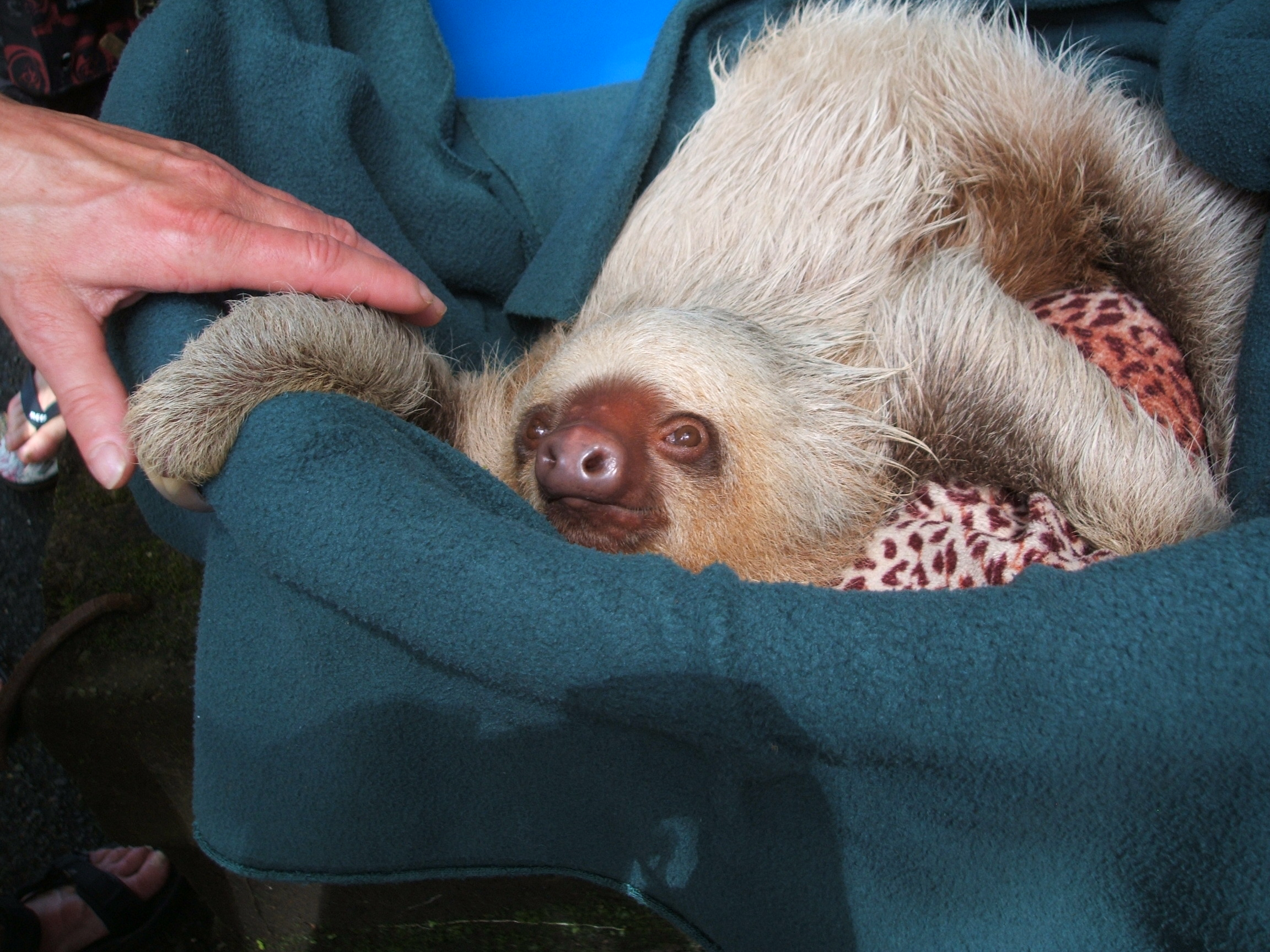
Young sloth being raised in a wildlife rescue centre on the Gulf of Dulce, Costa Rica

Birth takes place on either the ground or in the hanging position. Newborn sloths weigh 340 to 454 g (12.0 to 16.0 oz), and are precocial, already possessing long claws and able to cling to their mothers' undersides. The female is the one who solely takes care of the baby sloth until they are independent and do not need the mother anymore. They begin to take solid food at 15 to 27 days, and are fully weaned by 9 weeks. Although relatively quiet as adults, young sloths make loud bleating alarm calls if separated from their mothers. For the first 6–9 months of birth, mother sloth is carrying the baby and nurturing it until they are capable of being on their own. Sloths are sexually matured by the age 3 and are ready to start reproducing of their own.

In captivity, the two-toed sloth was seen giving birth by hanging upside down and attempting to pull the infant between her hind limbs and onto her abdomen. Other sloths were seen hanging under the mother and infant to protect the infant from falling.

Hoffmann's two-toed sloths reach sexual maturity at two to four years of age and have been reported to live up to 43 years in captivity.

== Adaptation ==
Sloths are known to be heterothermic. Their body temperature ranges 86–93 °F (30–34 °C), which, compared to other mammals, is on the cold side. Having these low temperatures helps the sloths conserve their energy. Sloths' fur is grown specifically for a job which is to grow algae. The algae grow within their hair shaft and benefits the creatures' camouflaging techniques. The hair grows in a special system of being parted along the stomach and flows from belly to back; this is useful for when sloths are hanging upside down and the rainwater can run off.

== Conservation status ==
Currently, Hoffman's two-toed sloth is rated at Least Concern by the International Union for Conservation of Nature (IUCN), but is still faced with numerous threats. These include deforestation, habitat disruption, and illegal poaching of juvenile sloths for trade.
