= Karl Hoffmann (naturalist) =

German physician and naturalist

Karl Hoffmann (7 December 1823 – 11 May 1859) was a German medical doctor and naturalist.

Hoffmann was born in Stettin, Kingdom of Prussia and studied at Berlin University. In 1853 he travelled to Costa Rica with Alexander von Frantzius to collect natural history specimens. With his wife, Emilia Hoffmann, he settled in San José, where he operated a consultation clinic and small pharmacy from his home. In order to supplement his income, he sold wine and liquor. He served as a doctor in the Costa Rican army during the invasion of William Walker in 1856. He died of typhoid in Puntarenas.

Hoffmann is commemorated in the names of a number of animals, including Hoffmann's two-toed sloth (Choloepus hoffmanni), Hoffmann's woodpecker (Melanerpes hoffmannii), the sulphur-winged parakeet (Pyrrhura hoffmanni), Hoffmann's antthrush (Formicarius hoffmanni), Hoffmann's earth snake (Geophis hoffmanni), and a millipede (Chondrodesmus hoffmanni (Peters, 1864)).

== Works about Karl Hoffmann ==
- Karl Hoffmann : naturalista, médico y héroe nacional, by Luko Hilje Q; Santo Domingo de Heredia : INBio, 2006. (in Spanish).
- Karl Hoffmann : cirujano mayor de ejército expedicionario, by Luko Hilje Q; Alajuela, C.R. : CUNA, 2007. (in Spanish).
