= Alexander von Frantzius =

German physician and naturalist

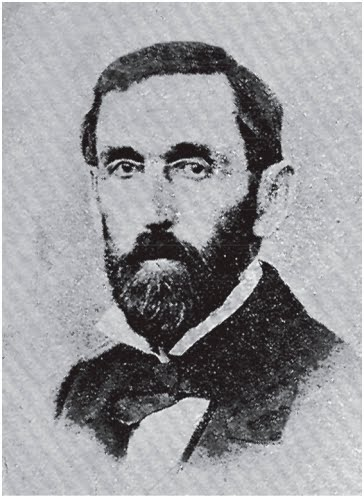
Alexander von Frantzius

Alexander von Frantzius (10 June 1821, in Danzig – 18 July 1877) was a German medical doctor and naturalist.

He studied medicine at the universities of Heidelberg, Erlangen, Halle and Berlin, where in 1846, he obtained his doctorate. In 1853, with fellow naturalist, Karl Hoffmann, he journeyed to Costa Rica, where he would spend the next 15 years conducting geographical, climatological, ethnographical and zoological research. Many of the zoological specimens he collected were sent to Jean Cabanis at the Berlin Museum.

After arriving in Costa Rica, he settled in Alajuela (1854), later setting up a successful pharmacy in San José, an institution that eventually became known as the Botica Francesa. Here he employed José Castulo Zeledón as an assistant. He returned to Germany in 1868, settling in Heidelberg, from where he served as secretary of the Gesellschaft für Anthropologie (German Anthropological Society). In July 1877, he died in Freiburg from lung disease.

He is commemorated in the names of a number of animals, including the prong-billed barbet Semnornis frantzii, the fiery-billed aracari Pteroglossus frantzii, the mountain elaenia Elaenia frantzii and the ruddy-capped nightingale-thrush Catharus frantzii. The botanical genus Frantzia (Cucurbitaceae) was named in his honor by Henri Pittier.

== Bibliography ==
- Aristoteles' Vier Bücher ueber die Theile der Thiere: Griechisch und Deutsch und mit sacherklärenden Anmerkungen, Leipzig: W. Engelmann,1853.
