= A. pretrei =

A. pretrei may refer to:

- Amazona pretrei, the Red-spectacled Amazon, a species of parrot found in Argentina and Brazil
- Amphisbaena pretrei, Duméril & Bibron, 1839, a worm lizard species in the genus Amphisbaena found in Brazil

== See also ==
- Pretrei (disambiguation)
