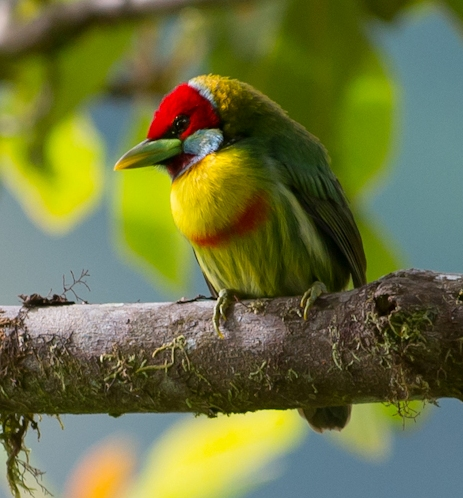
- Male "blue-moustached" form

Conservation status
- Not evaluated (IUCN 3.1) (Note: The versicolored barbet is split into three species by the IUCN: blue-moustached barbet (E. versicolor), blue-cowled barbet (E. steerii) and blue-chinned barbet (E. glaucogularis). The blue-moustached and blue-cowled barbets are assessed as being of least concern, while the blue-chinned barbet is assessed as being near-threatened.)

Scientific classification
- Kingdom: Animalia
- Phylum: Chordata
- Class: Aves
- Order: Piciformes
- Family: Capitonidae
- Genus: Eubucco
- Species: E. versicolor

Binomial name
- Eubucco versicolor (Statius Müller, 1776)
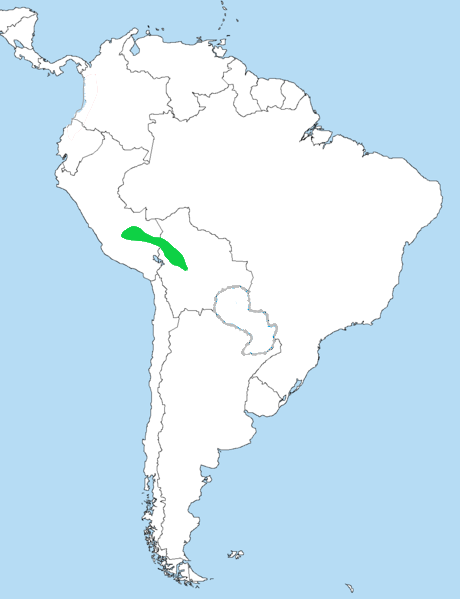
- resident range

= Versicolored barbet =

Species of bird

The versicolored barbet (Eubucco versicolor) is a very colorful species of bird in the family Capitonidae, the New World barbets. It is found in Bolivia and Peru.

== Taxonomy and systematics ==
The versicolored barbet was described by Statius Müller in 1776 as Bucco versicolor, based on a specimen collected in Maynas Province, Peru. Its taxonomy is in flux. The South American Classification Committee of the American Ornithological Society (AOS), the International Ornithological Committee (IOC), and the Clements taxonomy treat it as one species with three subspecies. The HBW and BirdLife International Illustrated Checklist of the Birds of the World treats the three as individual species.

The three subspecies are:

- E. v. steerii ("blue-cowled") Sclater & Salvin (1878)
- E. v. glaucogularis ("blue-chinned") Tschudi (1844)
- E. v. versicolor ("blue-moustached") Müller (1776)

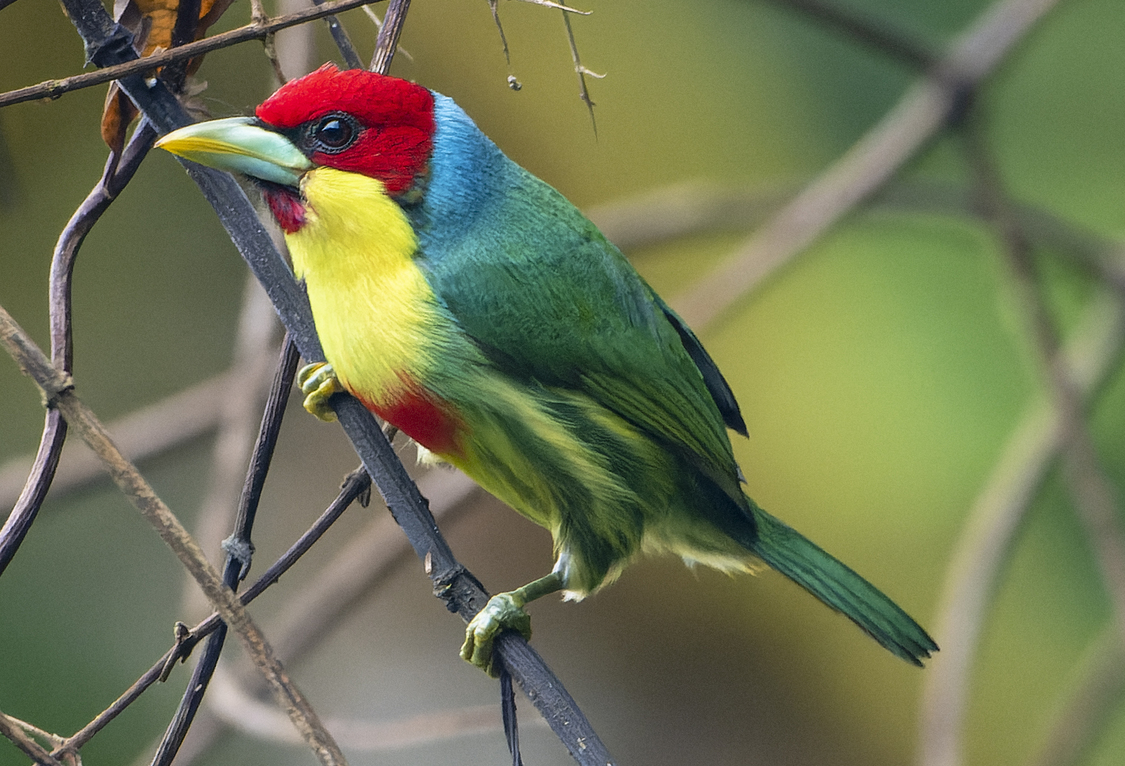
Blue-cowled subspecies, E. v. steerii

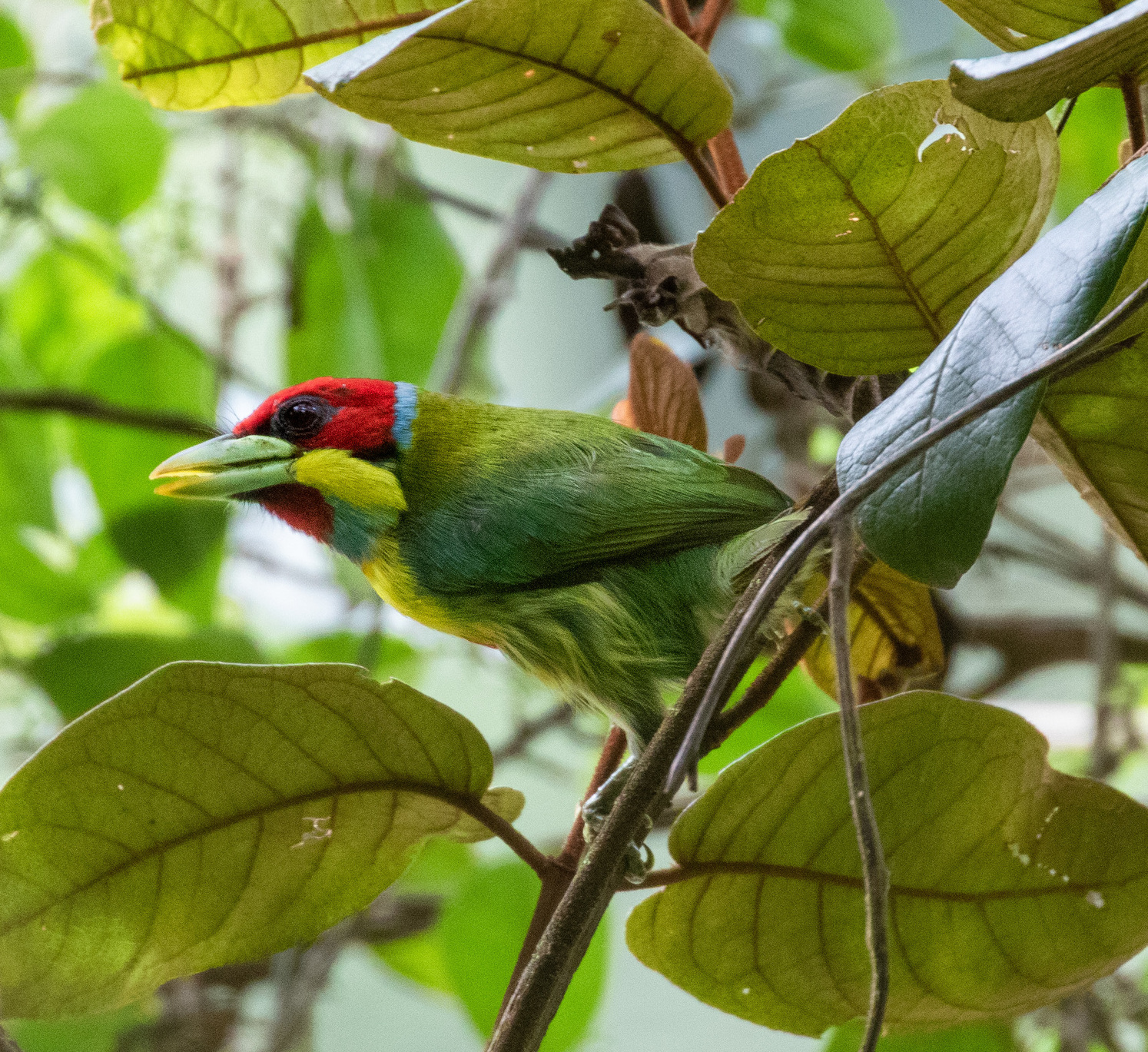
Blue-chinned subspecies. E. v. glaucogularis

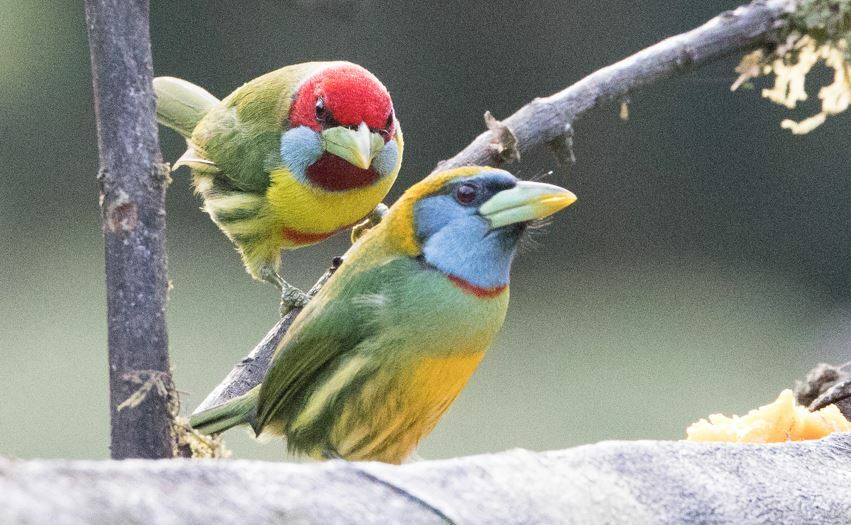
Blue-moustached subspecies, E. v. versicolor

== Description ==
The versicolored barbet is multicolored and like all barbets has a sturdy bill. The subspecies differ in their plumage, but all the males have a red face and crown and green to blue-green upperparts. The males' lower breasts are red and their bellies yellowish with green streaks, though the size and shape of the red vary. The female's upperparts are also green to blue-green and their bellies a similar yellowish with green streaks. All the subspecies are approximately 16 cm (6.3 in) long but differ in their weights.

The nominate "blue-moustached" form weighs 28 to 39 g (0.99 to 1.38 oz). The male has a red throat with a thin blue band below it. It has a blue malar patch (the "moustache") and a blue band separating the red head from the greenish back. Its upper breast is yellow. The female has a greenish cap, blue malars with a yellow edge, and a blue throat with a thin red band below it.

The "blue-cowled" form weighs 31 to 37 g (1.1 to 1.3 oz). The back of the male's head and nape (the "cowl") are blue. It has a red chin and yellow malars and throat. The female's crown and nape are yellow. Its face, throat, and upper breast are blue with a thin red crescent dividing the throat and breast.

The "blue-chinned" form weighs 26 to 41 g (0.92 to 1.45 oz). The male has a thin blue band behind the head like the "blue-moustached" form and a yellow malar. It has successive bands of red, blue, and orange between its bill and its yellow upper breast. The female has a yellow crown and nape. Its face and throat are blue with a red band below the latter.

== Distribution and habitat ==
The nominate "blue-moustached" barbet is found from Peru's Cuzco and Puno Regions eastward to Cochabamba Department in north central Bolivia. The "blue-cowled" form is found only in Peru, from west central Amazonas south to northern Huánuco. The "blue-chinned" form is also found only in Peru, along the eastern slope of the Andes from eastern Huánuco to northern Cuzco.

All subspecies of the versicolored barbet inhabit humid submontane forest, especially those heavy with epiphytes and mosses, as well as mature secondary forest. The nominate also inhabits dry forest in Bolivia. All three typically range in elevation from 1,000 to 2,000 m (3,300 to 6,600 ft) but can be found as high as 2,225 m (7,300 ft).

== Behavior ==
=== Feeding ===
Only the nominate form of versicolored barbet's diet and foraging technique have been studied; those of the other forms are assumed to be similar. About 80% of its diet is fruits and seeds and the remainder mostly arthropods. It forages alone, in pairs, and sometimes with mixed-species foraging flocks, usually between 10 and 25 m (33 and 82 ft) above the ground. It seeks arthropod prey by poking and tearing clusters of dead leaves.

=== Breeding ===
The subspecies of the versicolored barbet have not been studied individually. The species apparently breeds between July and December. One nest (of the nominate) has been described; it was in a tree hole and contained three eggs.

=== Vocalization ===
No differences are known in the vocalizations of the versicolored barbet's subspecies. Its song is " a fast, low-pitched trill" .

== Status ==
The IUCN has separately assessed the three subspecies of versicolored barbet. The "blue-moustached" and "blue-cowled" forms are considered of Least Concern, though until 2020 the latter had been rated Near Threatened. The "blue-chinned" form is considered Near Threatened. It "could be undergoing a moderately rapid decline...[and] the population may be moderately small".

== Gallery ==
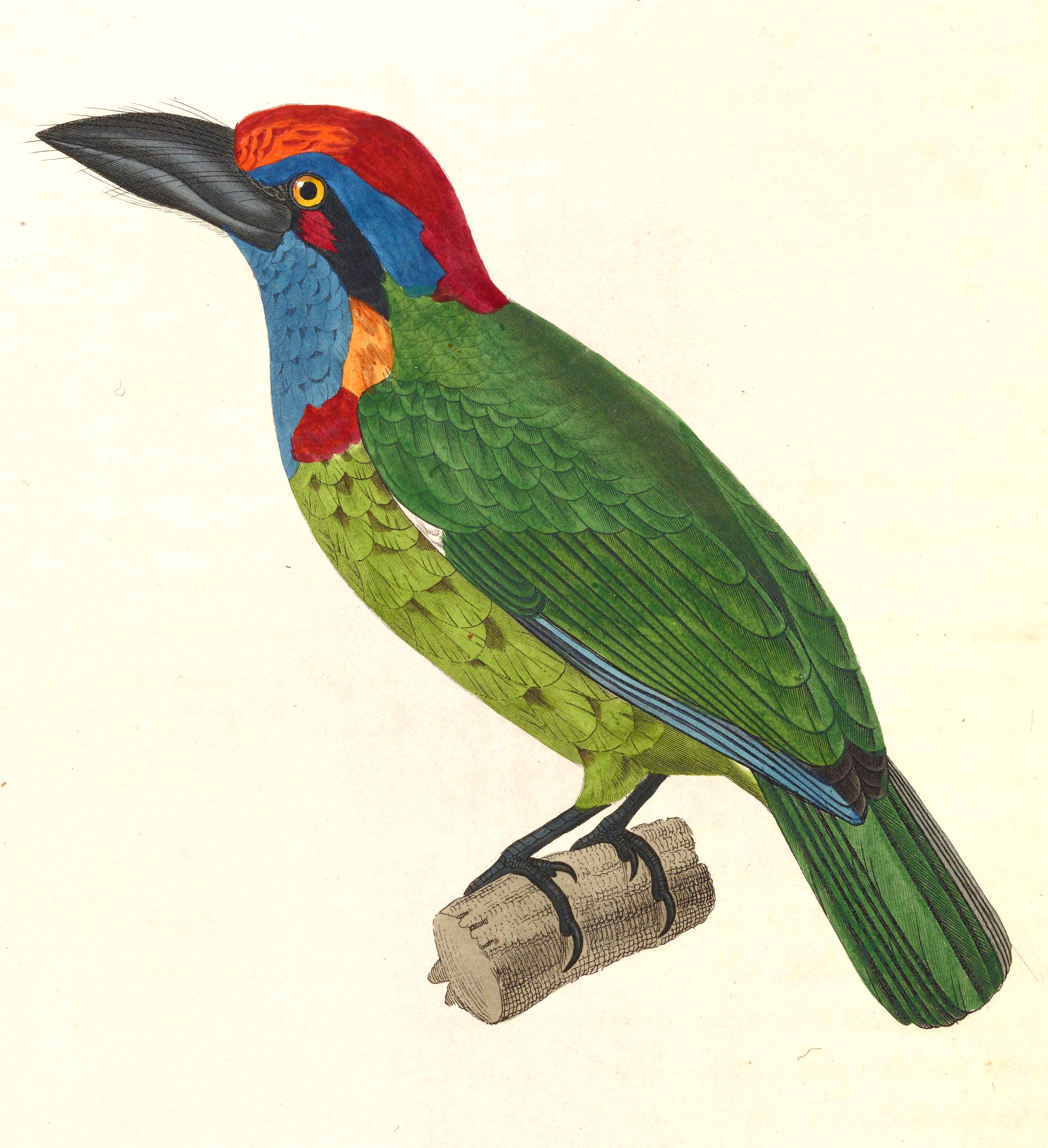
Male illustrated by Prêtre, 1838

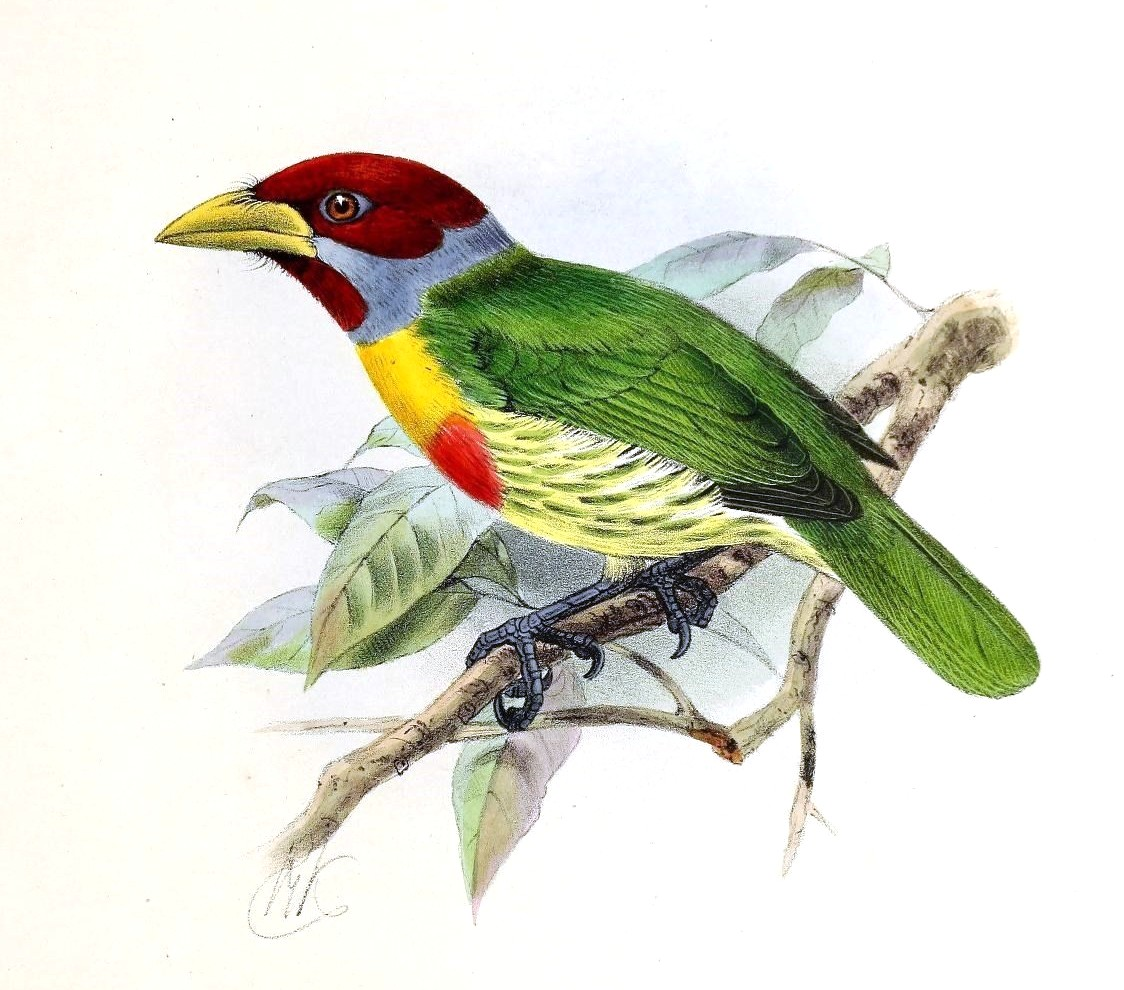
Male illustrated by Keulemans, 1871

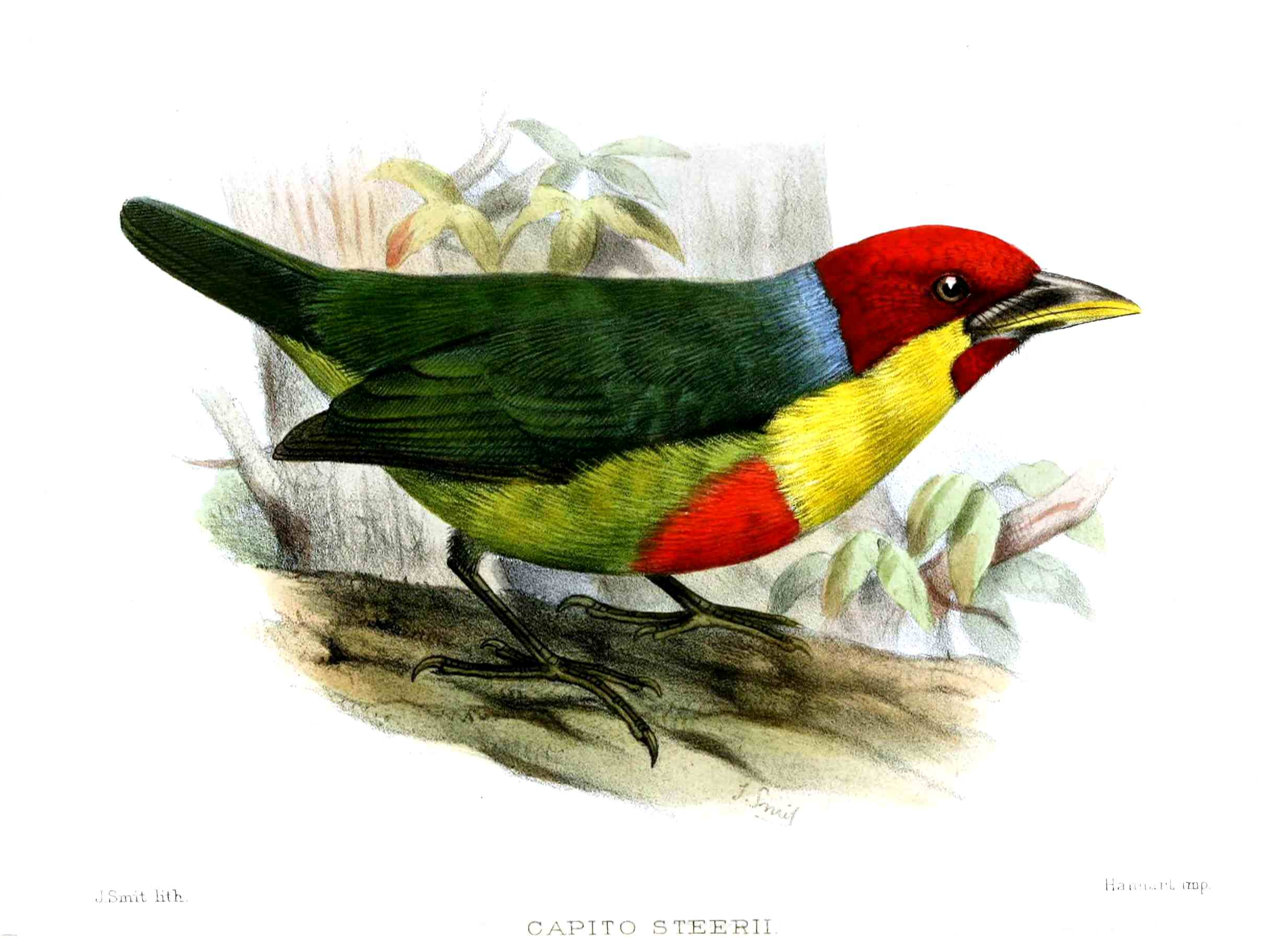
Male of E. v. steerii illustrated by Smit, 1878
