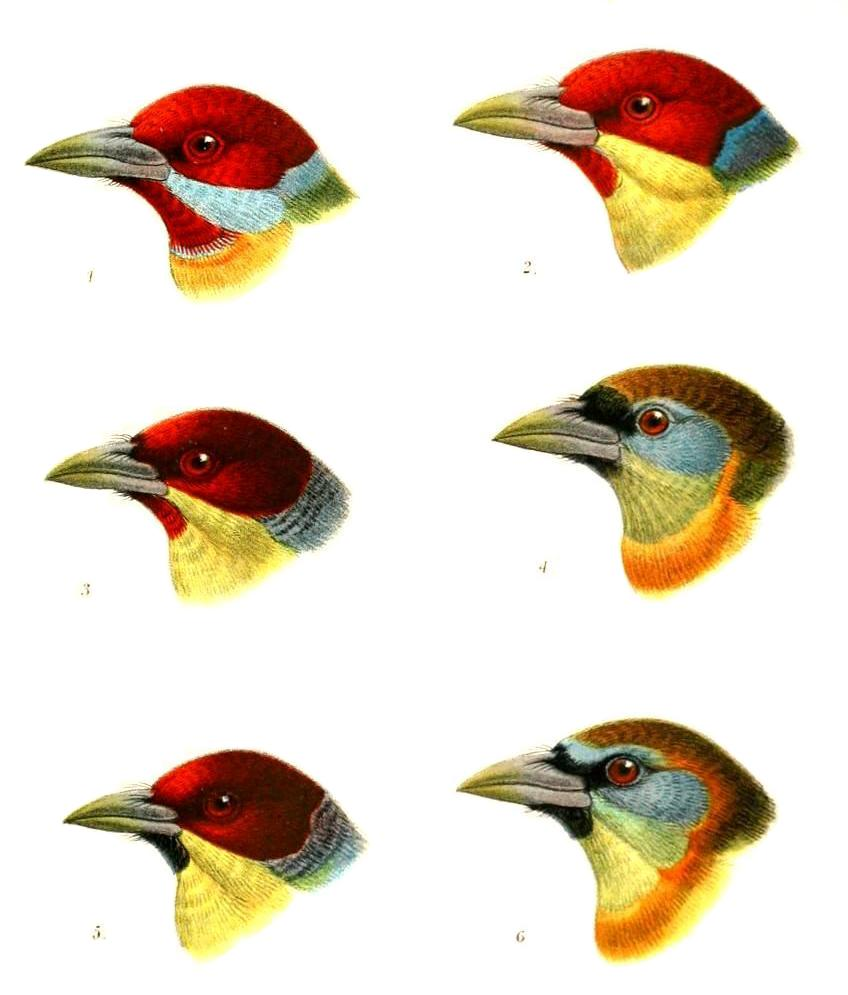
- heads of three species (five races) Eubucco versicolor (1. & 2.); Eubucco richardsoni (3. & 5.); Eubucco bourcierii (4. & 6.)

Scientific classification
- Domain: Eukaryota
- Kingdom: Animalia
- Phylum: Chordata
- Class: Aves
- Order: Piciformes
- Family: Capitonidae
- Genus: Eubucco; Bonaparte, 1850

Species
- 4, see text

= Eubucco =

Genus of birds

Eubucco is a genus of colourful birds in the family Capitonidae. They are found in humid forest in South and Central America, and the species have almost entirely allo- or parapatric distributions. Slightly smaller than the members of the genus Capito, members of the genus Eubucco are all sexually dimorphic, have stubby yellowish bills, green backs, yellow to the neck or underparts, and, at least in the males, red to the head. Typically seen singly or in pairs, they are primarily frugivorous, but also take arthropods.

== Species ==
Genus Eubucco – Bonaparte, 1850 – four species
Common name	Scientific name and subspecies	Range	Size and ecology	IUCN status and estimated population
Red-headed barbet Male Female	Eubucco bourcierii (Lafresnaye, 1845) Six subspecies: E. b. salvini Shelley (1891); E. b. anomalus Griscom (1929); E. b. occidentalis Chapman (1914); E. b. bourcierii Lafresnaye (1845); E. b. aequatorialis Salvadori & Festa (1900); E. b. orientalis Chapman (1914)	Costa Rica and Panama, as well as the Andes in western Venezuela, Colombia, Ecuador and far northern Peru.	Size: Habitat: Diet:	LC
Lemon-throated barbet	Eubucco richardsoni (Gray, 1846) Four subspecies: E. r. richardsoni; E. r. nigriceps; E. r. aurantiicollis; E. r. purusianus	central and southern Colombia, eastern Ecuador, northern Peru and the extreme north west of Brazil.	Size: Habitat: Diet:	LC
Scarlet-hooded barbet	Eubucco tucinkae (Seilern, 1913)	south-western Amazon Basin in south-eastern Peru, north-western Bolivia and south-western Brazil	Size: Habitat: Diet:	LC
Versicolored barbet	Eubucco versicolor (Statius Müller, 1776)	Peru and Bolivia.	Size: Habitat: Diet:	LC
