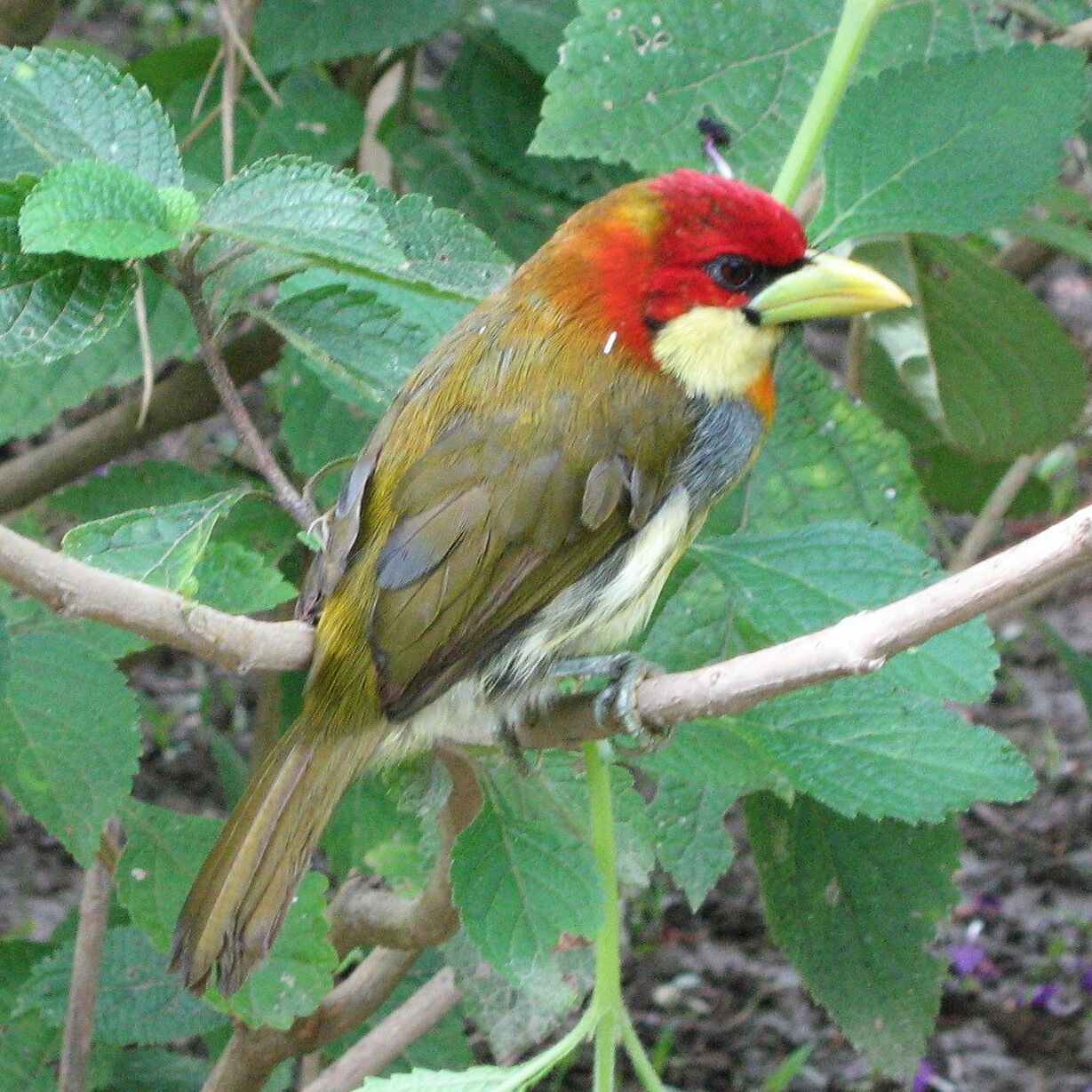
- Adult female near Madre de Dios River, Peru

Conservation status
- Least Concern (IUCN 3.1)

Scientific classification
- Kingdom: Animalia
- Phylum: Chordata
- Class: Aves
- Order: Piciformes
- Family: Capitonidae
- Genus: Eubucco
- Species: E. tucinkae

Binomial name
- Eubucco tucinkae (Seilern, 1913)
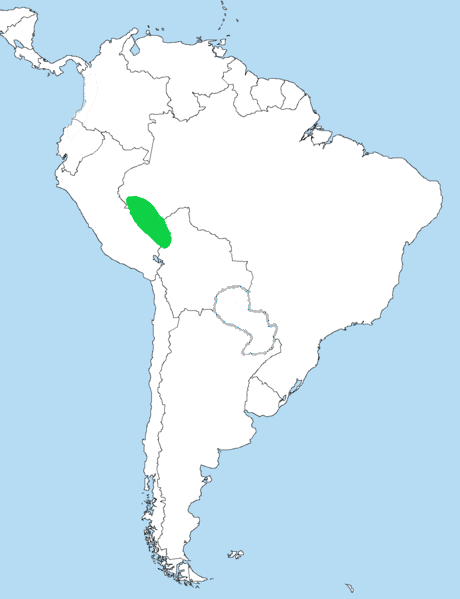
- resident range

= Scarlet-hooded barbet =

Species of bird

The scarlet-hooded barbet (Eubucco tucinkae) is a species of bird in the family Capitonidae, the New World barbets. It is found in Bolivia, Brazil, and Peru.

== Taxonomy and systematics ==
The scarlet-hooded barbet is monotypic.

At times it was thought to be closely related to the red-headed barbet (Eubucco bourceirii) and possibly conspecific, but it is treated now as a full species with no close relatives even within its genus.

== Description ==
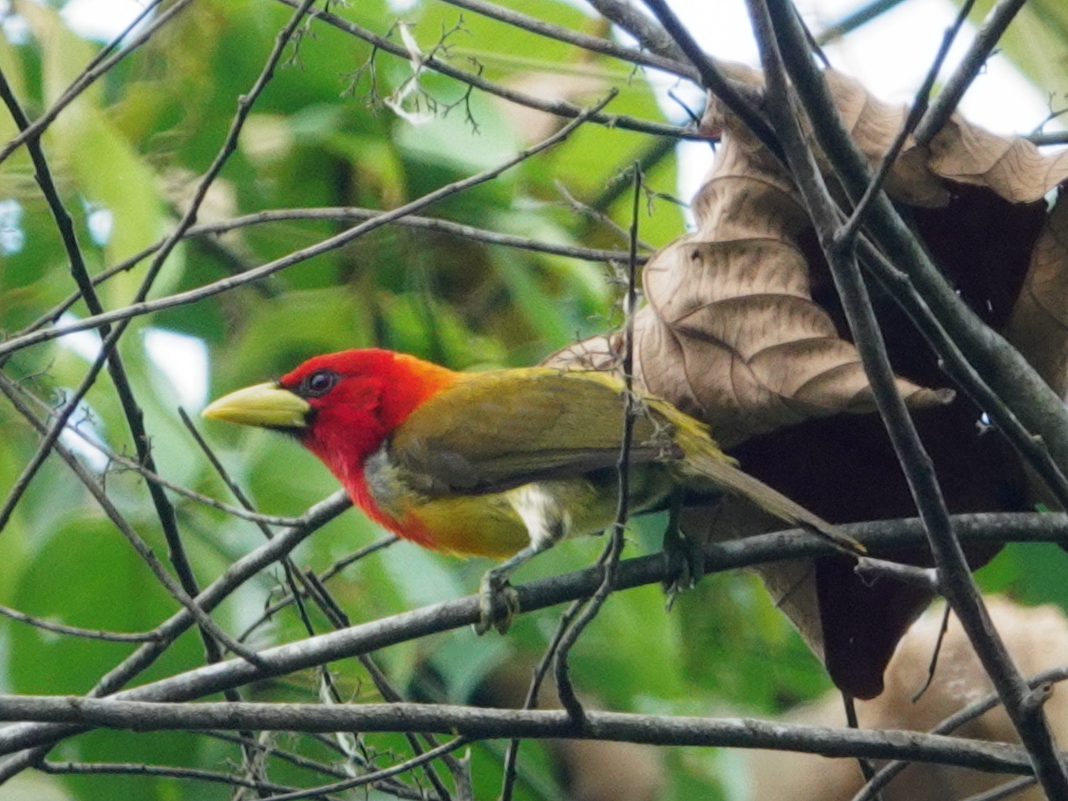
Adult male near Madre de Dios River, Peru

The scarlet-hooded barbet is approximately 17 cm (6.7 in) long and weighs 40 to 44 g (1.4 to 1.6 oz). The male's entire head, throat, and upper mantle are red but for a bit of black around the eye and bill. The rest of the upperparts are green. Its lower breast is orange and yellow; it has a gray patch on the side and the flanks are streaked with olive. Most of the female's head is also red, but the throat is yellow. It has an orange band on the upper breast and the rest of the underparts are like the male's.

== Distribution and habitat ==
The scarlet-hooded barbet is found in the upper Amazon Basin where eastern Peru, western Brazil, and a bit of western Bolivia meet. More than half of its range is in Peru. It inhabits bamboo and Heleconia in dense understory, always within approximately 150 m (490 ft) of rivers and oxbow lakes. It can also be found in overgrown gardens near rivers and on river islands. In elevation it ranges from approximately 150 to 850 m (490 to 2,790 ft).

== Behavior ==
=== Feeding ===
The scarlet-hooded barbet's diet is approximately 60% fruits such as figs and Cecropia seeds and 40% insects and other arthropods of many kinds. It also eats flowers and nectar. It forages from near the ground up to approximately 11 m (36 ft) by gleaning fruits and probing dead leaf clusters for insects. It joins mixed-species foraging flocks.

=== Breeding ===
The scarlet-hooded barbet nests in Peru in July and possibly. Like all New World barbets, it excavates a nest hole, usually in a tree, but virtually nothing else is known about its breeding phenology.

=== Vocalization ===
The scarlet-hooded barbet's song is "a fast 'oop-oop-oop-'" .

== Status ==
The IUCN has assessed the scarlet-hooded barbet as being of Least Concern. However, "[further] data [are] required on its breeding habits and requirements."
