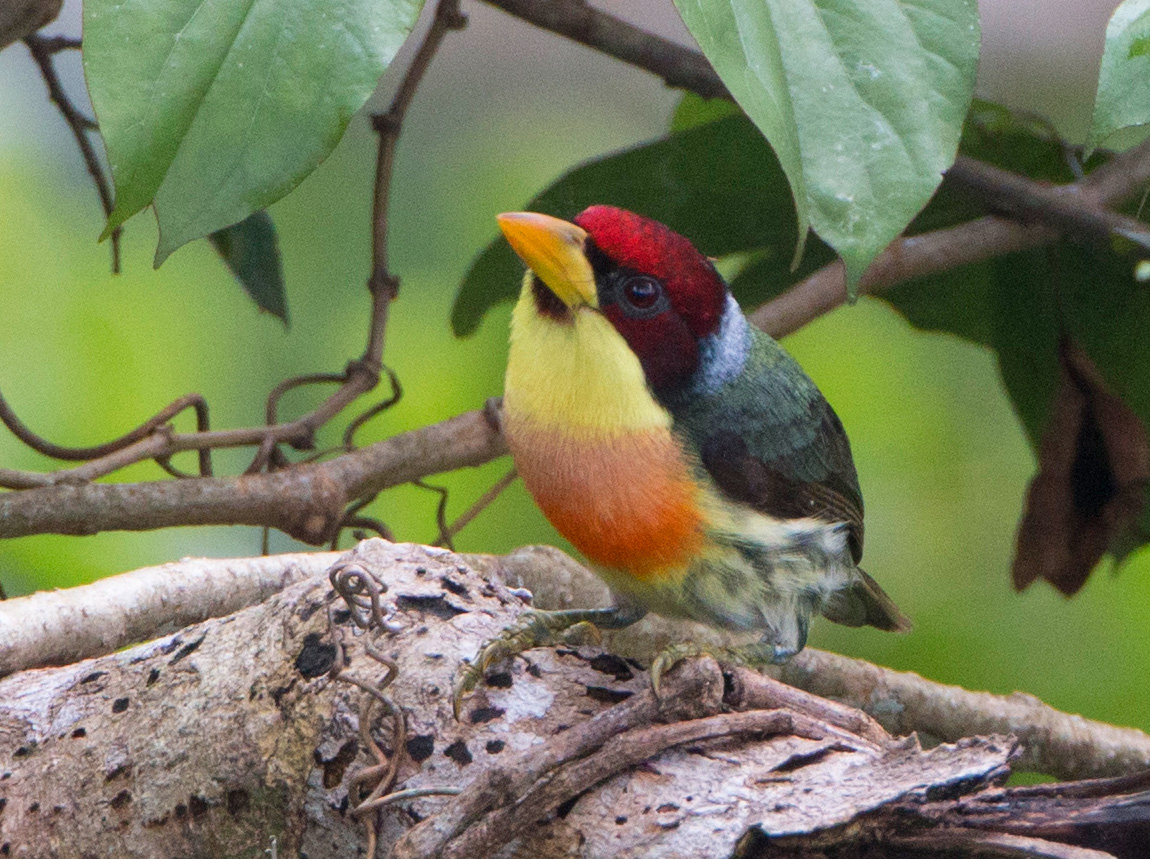
- Male E. r. richardsoni

Conservation status
- Least Concern (IUCN 3.1) (Note: The lemon-throated barbet is split into two species by the IUCN: lemon-throated barbet (E. richardsoni) and flame-throated barbet (E. aurantiicollis). Both of the species are assessed as being of least concern.)

Scientific classification
- Kingdom: Animalia
- Phylum: Chordata
- Class: Aves
- Order: Piciformes
- Family: Capitonidae
- Genus: Eubucco
- Species: E. richardsoni

Binomial name
- Eubucco richardsoni (Gray, 1846)
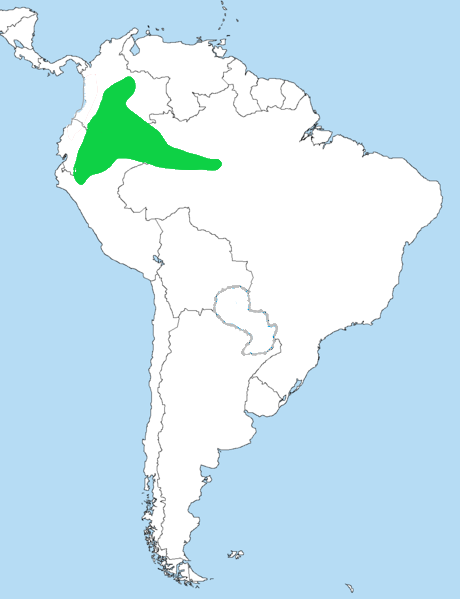
- resident range

= Lemon-throated barbet =

Species of bird

The lemon-throated barbet (Eubucco richardsoni) is a species of bird in the New World barbet family Capitonidae. It is found in Bolivia, Brazil, Colombia, Ecuador, and Peru.

== Taxonomy and systematics ==
The lemon-throated barbet as recognized by the South American Classification Committee of the American Ornithological Society (AOS), the International Ornithological Committee (IOC), and the Clements taxonomy has four subspecies: the nominate Eubucco richardsoni richardsoni, E. r. nigriceps, E. r. aurantiicollis, and E. r. purusianus. Clements groups richardsoni and nigriceps as "lemon-throated" and the other two as "flame-throated" within the species. The Cornell Lab of Ornithology's Birds of the World treats the two groups separately within its account of the lemon-throated barbet sensu lato. At various times, including as recently as 2014, aurantiicollis has been treated as a separate species called flame-throated barbet.

== Description ==
The "lemon-throated" barbet is approximately 15.5 cm (6.1 in) long and weighs 24.5 to 34 g (0.86 to 1.20 oz). The male of the nominate subspecies has a red crown, gray-blue nape, and green upperparts. Its throat is yellow, the breast orange-red, and the belly and flanks greenish with dark streaks. The female is duller, with a gray-green crown, nape, and upperparts. Its throat is bluish, the breast orange-gold, and the underparts bluish yellow with dark streaks. The male E. r. nigriceps has a black crown and both sexes have blue-green upperparts.

The "flame-throated" barbet is 14.5 to 15.5 cm (5.7 to 6.1 in) long and weighs 26 to 42 g (0.92 to 1.48 oz), heavier than the two "lemon-throated" subspecies. E. r. aurantiicollis differs from the nominate by having a yellow nape, upperparts that are a yellower green, a more orange throat, and a redder breast. The female is similar to the nominate but less yellow in the throat and breast. The E. r. purusianus male is paler than the nominate and more pinkish on the breast. The female's breast band is the same orange-gold as the nominate's but narrower.

== Distribution and habitat ==
The lemon-throated barbet is a bird of the western Amazon Basin. The four subspecies are found thus:

- E. r. richardsoni, from eastern Colombia's Arauca Department south and east through eastern Ecuador into northern Peru west of Iquitos.
- E. r. nigriceps, from the lower Putumayo and Napo Rivers in northeastern Peru east to far western Amazonas, Brazil, north of the Amazon River. (One record further east in Jaú National Park)
- E. r. aurantiicollis, from the area of the Marañón River in eastern Peru east to near the Juruá River south of the Amazon in western Brazil and south to northwestern Bolivia.
- E. r. purusianus, western Brazil south of the Amazon from the Juruá River area east to the upper Madeira River.

All of the subspecies inhabit the same forest types, lowland terra firme and dense secondary forest and their edges and clearings. They also are found in the edges of várzea forest. They are more numerous in maturing forest near rivers and lakes than in fully mature forest. In elevation they range from the lowlands to 1,375 m (4,511 ft) in Colombia, 1,200 m (3,900 ft) in Ecuador, 1,100 m (3,600 ft) in Bolivia, and 1,000 m (3,300 ft) in Peru.

== Behavior ==
=== Feeding ===
The diet of the "flame-throated" barbet is fruits and arthropods, approximately evenly divided. It forages alone or in pairs from the canopy of the forest to within 5 m (16 ft) of the forest floor, but more commonly between 12 and 24 m (39 and 79 ft). It also frequently joins mixed-species foraging flocks. It spends more than one-third of its foraging time feeding on insects in dead leaf clusters. The "lemon throated" barbet's diet and foraging behavior have not been documented but are assumed to be very similar.

=== Breeding ===
The "lemon-throated" barbet's breeding season appears to be from April to November though it may begin in February. Its nest and eggs have not been described. The "flame-throated" barbet's breeding phenology has not been studied, though its breeding season is believed to start earlier than that of the nominate subspecies.

=== Vocalization ===
The songs of the four lemon-throated barbet subspecies do not differ substantially. Their song is "soft double or usually triple 'hoo' notes in [a] fast, trill-like series" . Its calls are "various grunts and snarls" .

== Status ==
The IUCN treats Eubucco richardsoni and E. aurantiicollis as separate species and has assessed both as being of Least Concern. Though their populations are unknown and are believed to be decreasing, those criteria have not reached the values needed for a more critical rating. Both occur in several protected areas.
