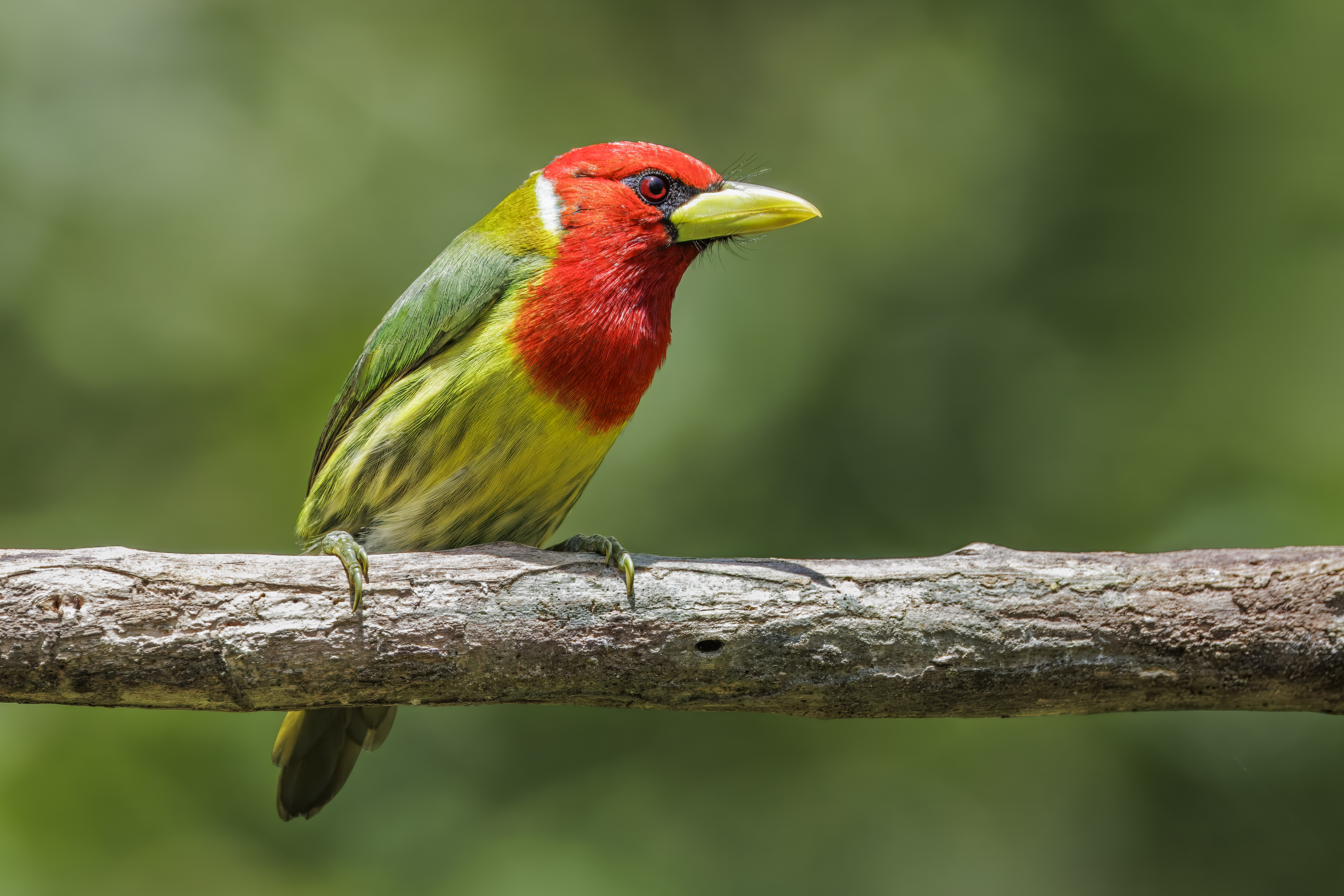
- Male E. b. aequatorialis in Ecuador
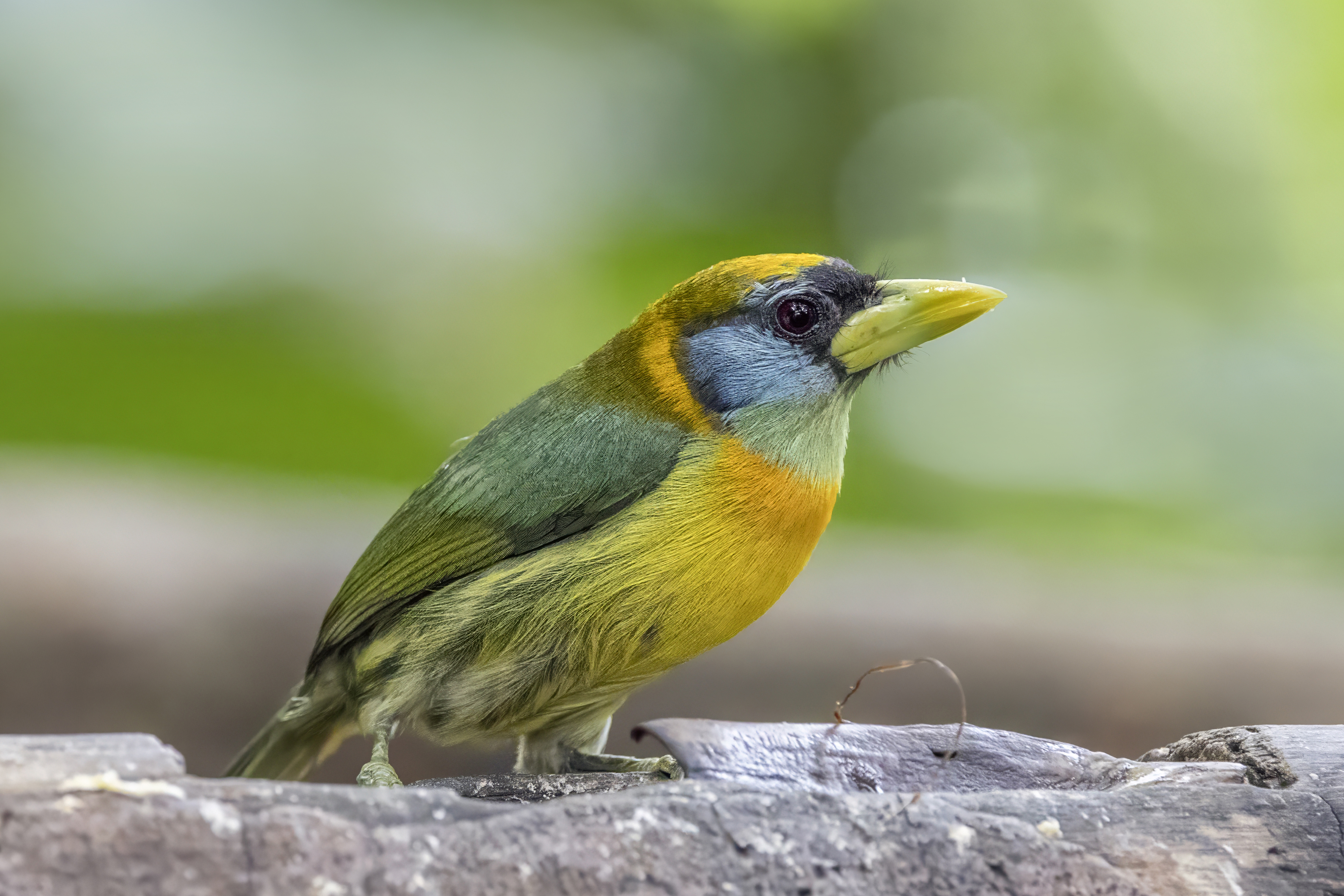
- Female E. b. occidentalis in Colombia

Conservation status
- Least Concern (IUCN 3.1)

Scientific classification
- Kingdom: Animalia
- Phylum: Chordata
- Class: Aves
- Order: Piciformes
- Family: Capitonidae
- Genus: Eubucco
- Species: E. bourcierii

Binomial name
- Eubucco bourcierii (Lafresnaye, 1845)
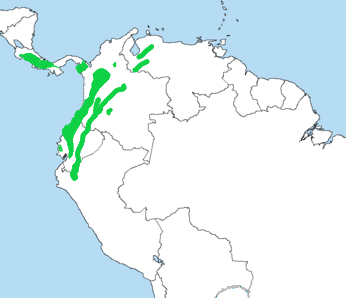
- resident range

= Red-headed barbet =

Species of bird

The red-headed barbet (Eubucco bourcierii) is a species of bird in the family Capitonidae, the New World barbets. It is found in Costa Rica, Guyana, Panama, Venezuela, Colombia, Ecuador and Peru.

== Taxonomy and systematics ==
The red-headed barbet has six subspecies:

- E. b. salvini Shelley (1891)
- E. b. anomalus Griscom (1929)
- E. b. occidentalis Chapman (1914)
- E. b. bourcierii Lafresnaye (1845)
- E. b. aequatorialis Salvadori & Festa (1900)
- E. b. orientalis Chapman (1914)

== Description ==
Male red-headed barbet subspecies except E. b. occidentalis range in weight from 30 to 41 g (1.1 to 1.4 oz). Females except occidentalis weigh 31 to 38 g (1.1 to 1.3 oz). Male occidentalis weigh 37.8 to 45.1 g (1.33 to 1.59 oz) and females 37.8 to 43.7 g (1.33 to 1.54 oz). Males have a red head, an orange to yellow breast, and a white belly. A white collar separates the head from the olive green back. The amount of red on the throat and chest and the width of the orange-yellow breast band vary among the subspecies. The female's crown and nape vary from dull orange to shades of green among the subspecies. Several have a black forehead. Its back is green, the throat grayish yellow with a yellow to orange band below it. Its lower breast is olive-yellow and the belly white. As in the male, there is some variation among subspecies.

== Distribution and habitat ==
The subspecies of the red-headed barbet are found thus:

- E. b. salvini, Costa Rica and western Panama
- E. b. anomalus, eastern Panama and probably adjacent northwestern Colombia
- E. b. occidentalis, both slopes of Colombia's Western Andes
- E. b. bourcierii, Andes of western Venezuela, the east slope of Colombia's Central Andes, and both slopes of Colombia's Eastern Andes
- E. b. aequatorialis, coastal mountains and the western slope of the Andes in Ecuador
- E. b. orientalis, eastern slope of the Andes in Ecuador and northern Peru

The red-headed barbet inhabits the interior and borders of evergreen mountain primary forest and also adjacent secondary forest. The species' overall elevational range is 400 to 2,400 m (1,300 to 7,900 ft) but there are large geographic variations.

== Behavior ==
=== Feeding ===
The red-headed barbet's diet has not been studied in detail, but it is known to include arthropods such as caterpillars and adult insects and fruit such as berries and (at feeders) bananas.

=== Breeding ===
Little has been published about the red-headed barbet's breeding phenology. Like other New World barbets, they excavate cavities in trees and sometimes in fence posts. The clutch size is two to five; the female incubates at night and both sexes do so during the day.

=== Vocalization ===
The red-headed barbet's song has been described as "a resonant, ventriloquial, somewhat toad-like trill krrrrrrrrrrr" . Some calls have been described as "grunts and snarls" .

== Status ==
The IUCN has assessed the red-headed barbet as being of Least Concern. "Although the overall population trend is believed to be one of decline, the rate of decline is not thought to be a cause for concern."
