= Jean-Gabriel Prêtre =

Swiss-French painter (1768–1849)

Jean-Gabriel Prêtre (20 December 1768 – 29 April 1849) was a Swiss-French natural history painter who illustrated birds, mammals and reptiles in a large number of books. Several species of animal were named after him.

== Biography ==
Prêtre was born in Geneva. His father Jean-Louis Prêtre married Judith Renauld on 28 December 1767 in the church of Saint Germain. From their marriage the children Pernette Marguerite, Jean-Gabriel and Marie were born. (Note: When he was baptised at the age of two in the Madeleine Church in Geneva, he was initially carried into the parish register under the name Jean Gabriel Praite. This error was corrected on 17 May 1794.)

He worked as a natural history illustrator, first for Empress Josephine's zoo, and then for the Natural History Museum in Paris. He illustrated many books of animals and birds, and had several species named after him, using the species name pretrei.

== Species named after Prêtre ==
A species of worm lizard, Amphisbaena pretrei, is named in his honor.

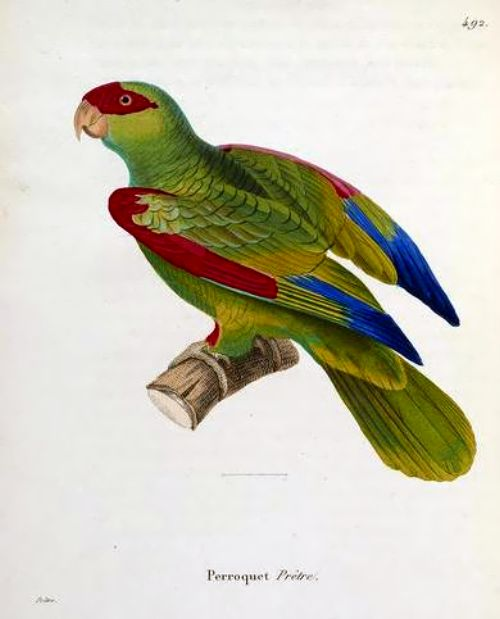
Amazona pretrei Lithograph by Jean-Gabriel Prêtre

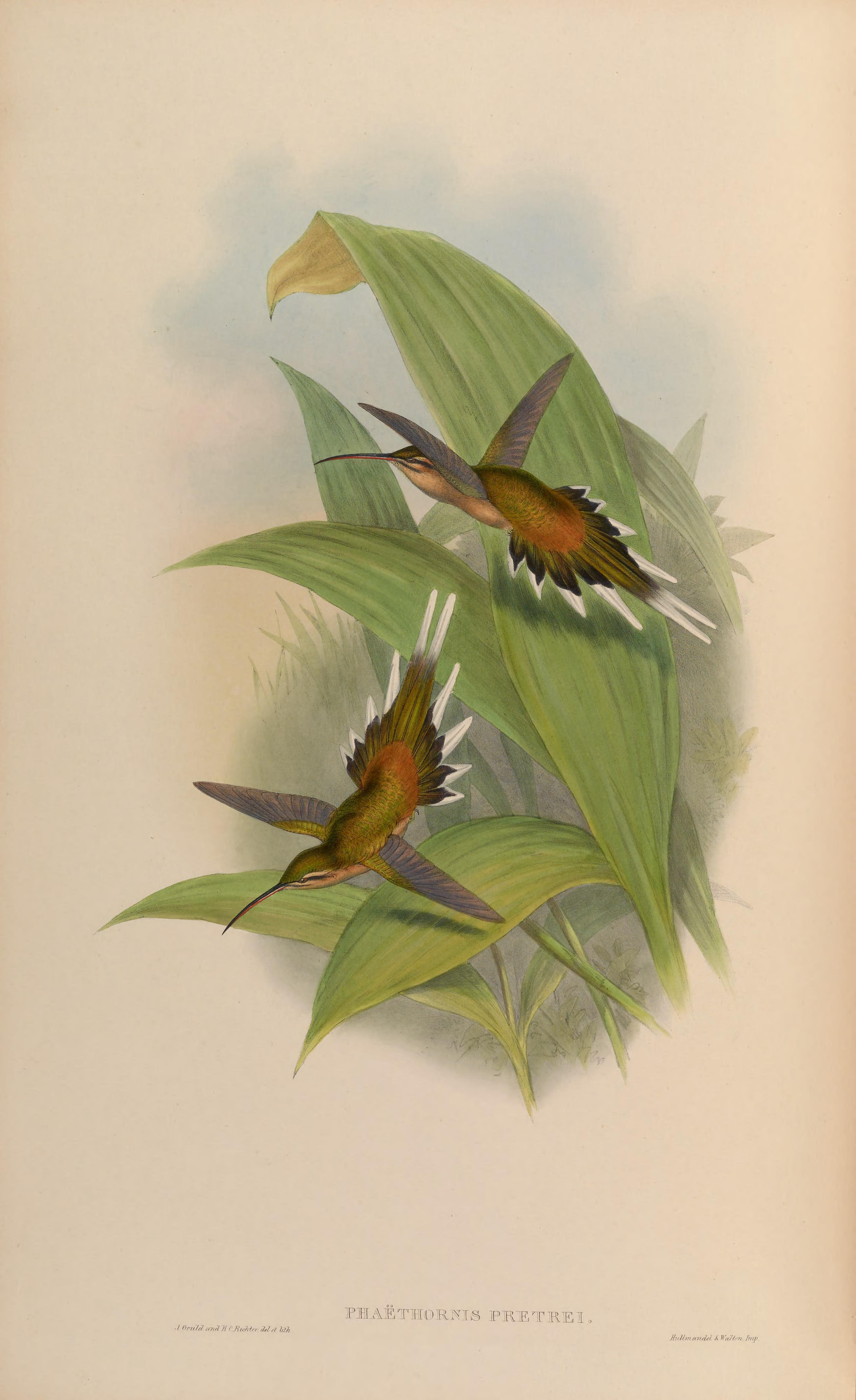
Phaethornis pretrei painted by John Gould and Henry Constantine Richter

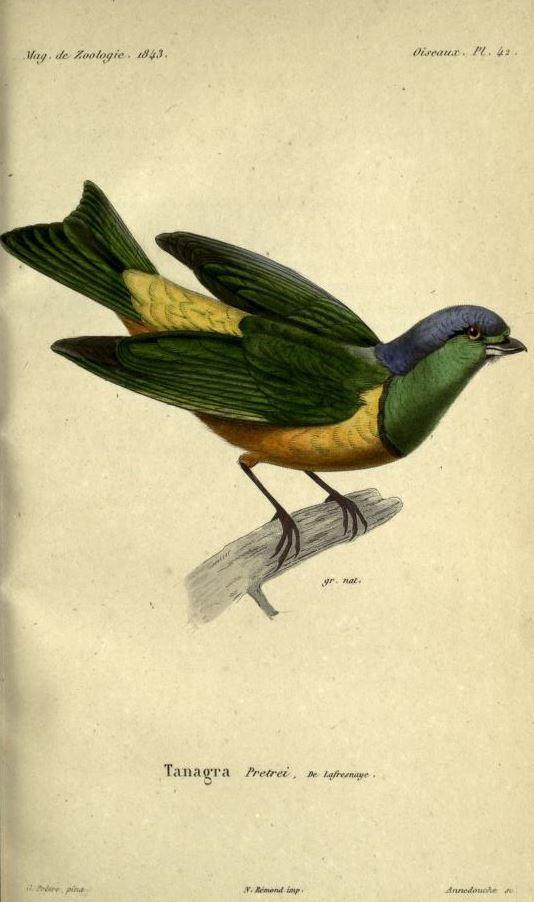
"Tanagra Pretrei Lafresnaye", a synonym for Chlorophonia pyrrhophrys

== Works ==
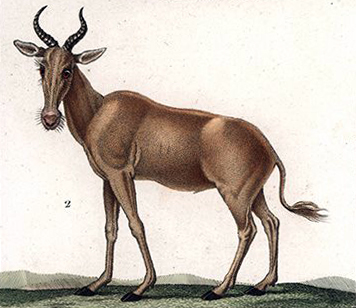
Alcelaphus buselaphus

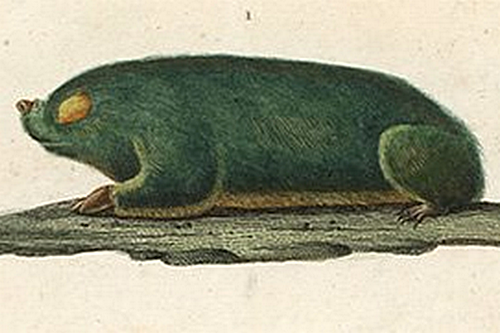
Chrysochloris asiatica

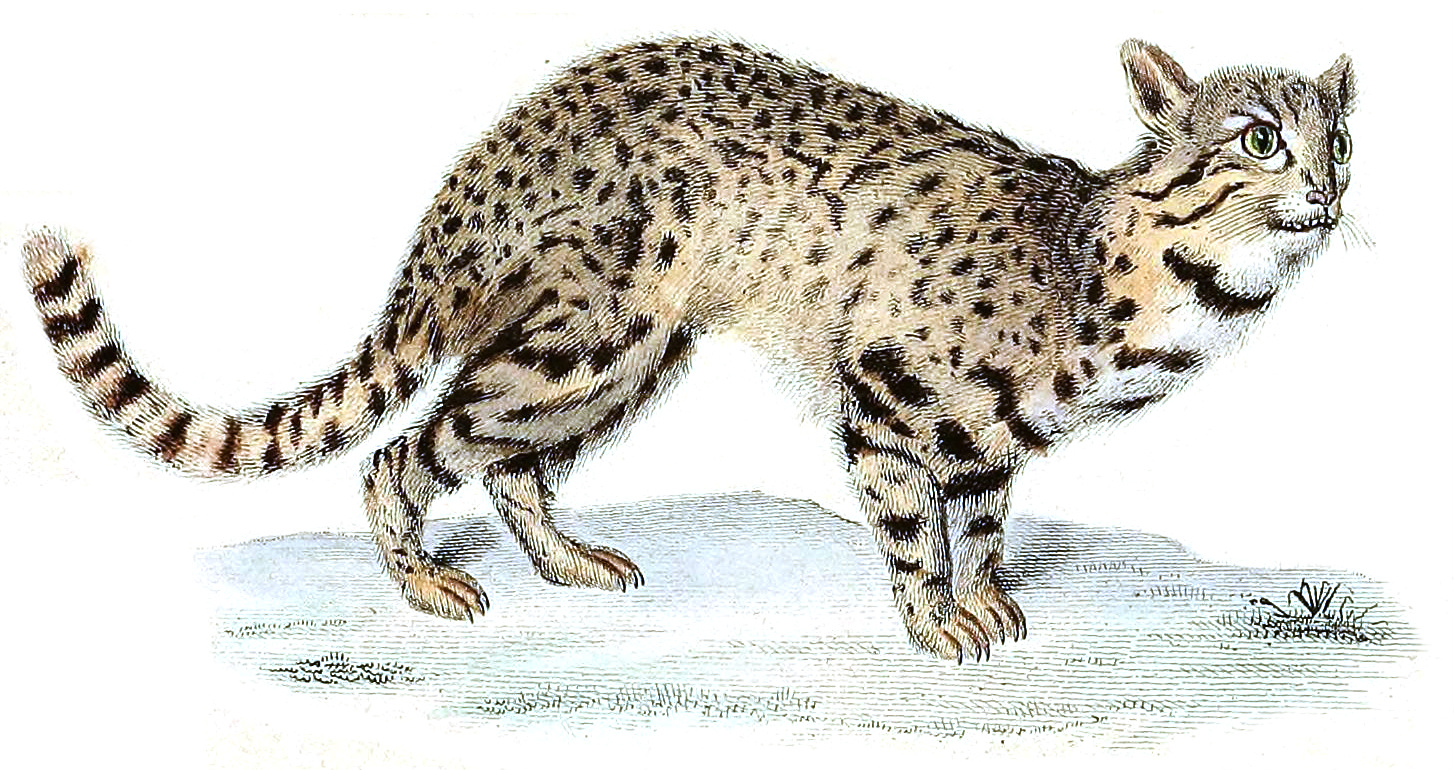
Leopardus geoffroyi

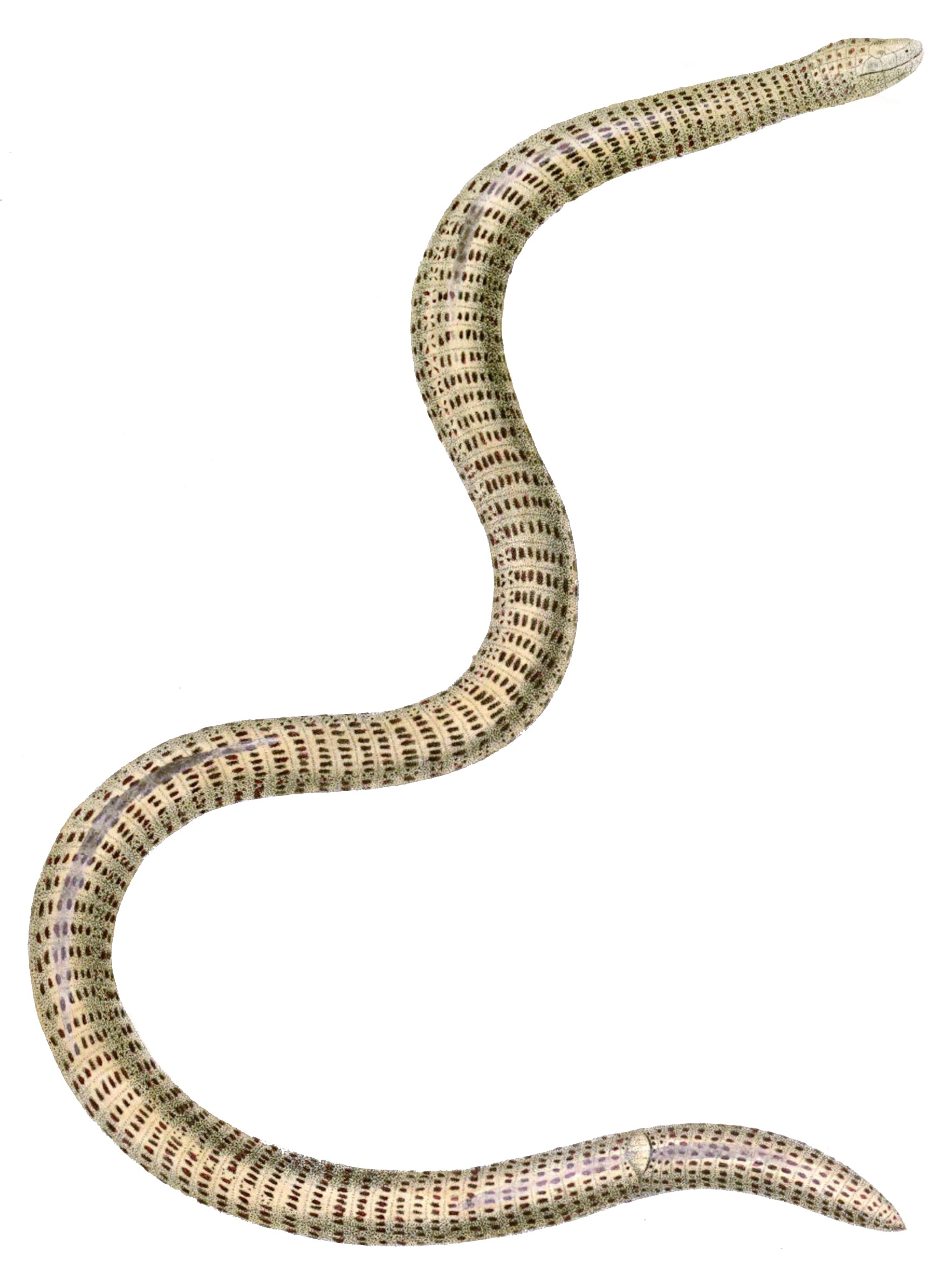
Blanus cinereus

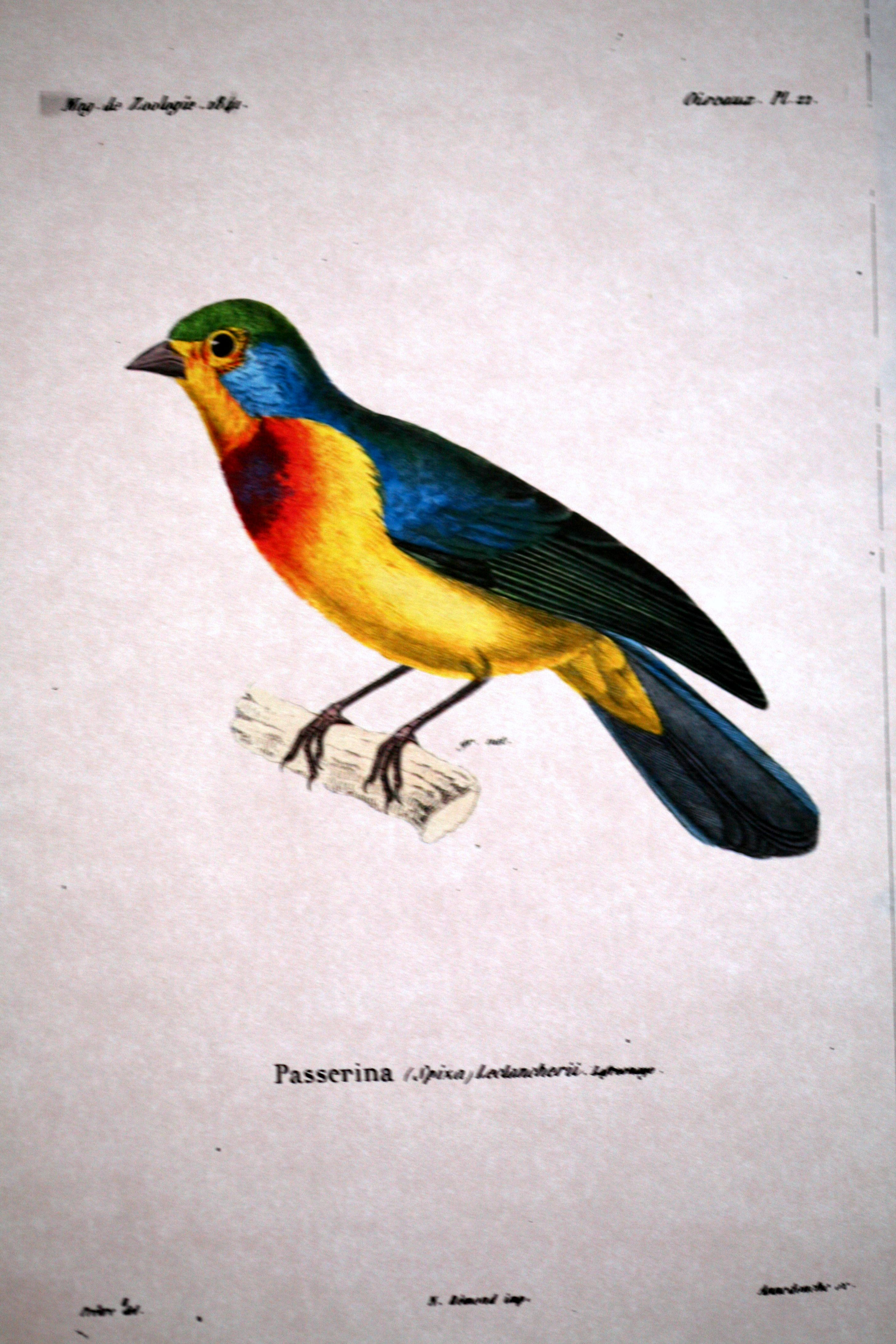
Passerina leclancherii

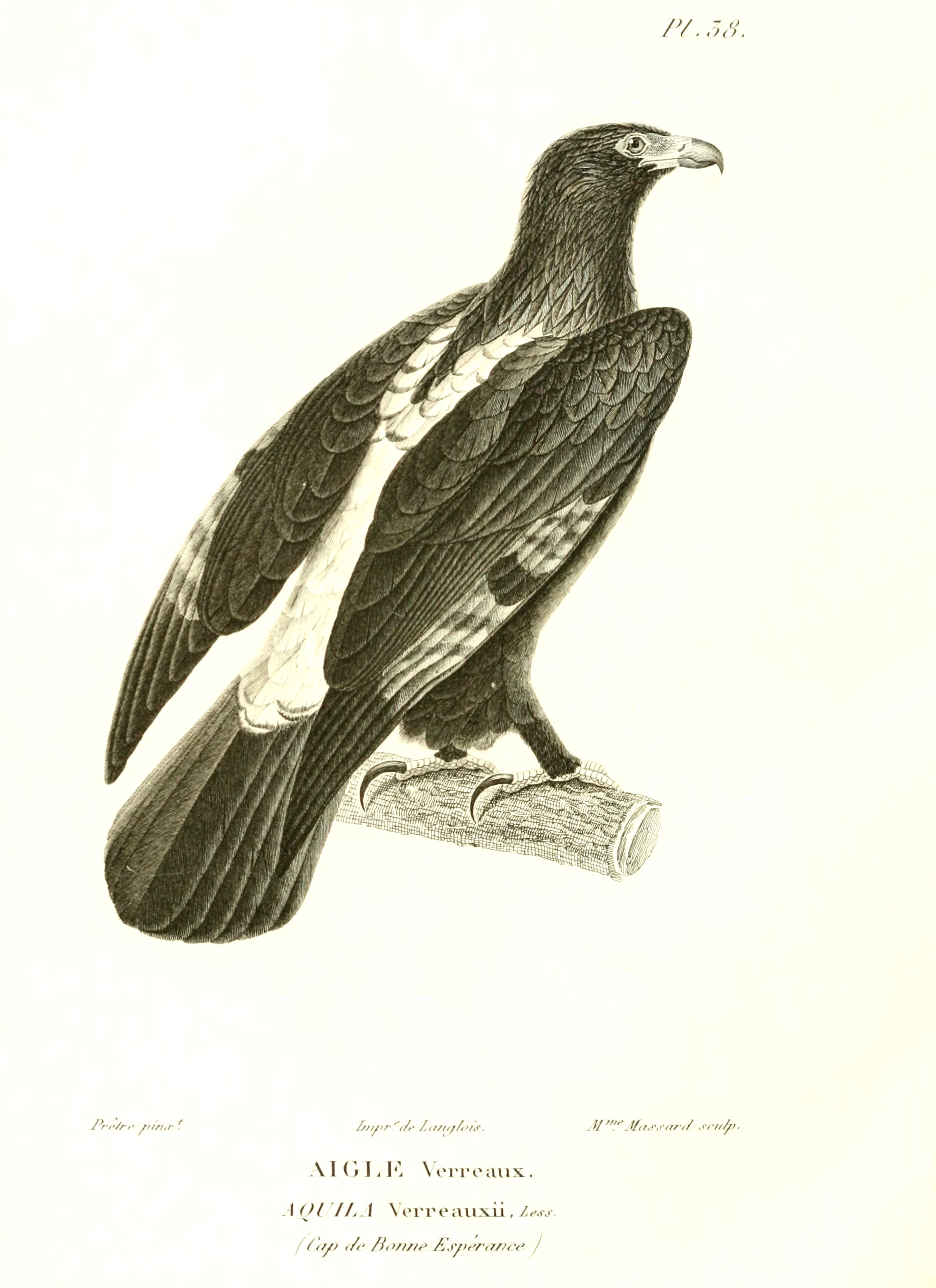
Verreaux's eagle

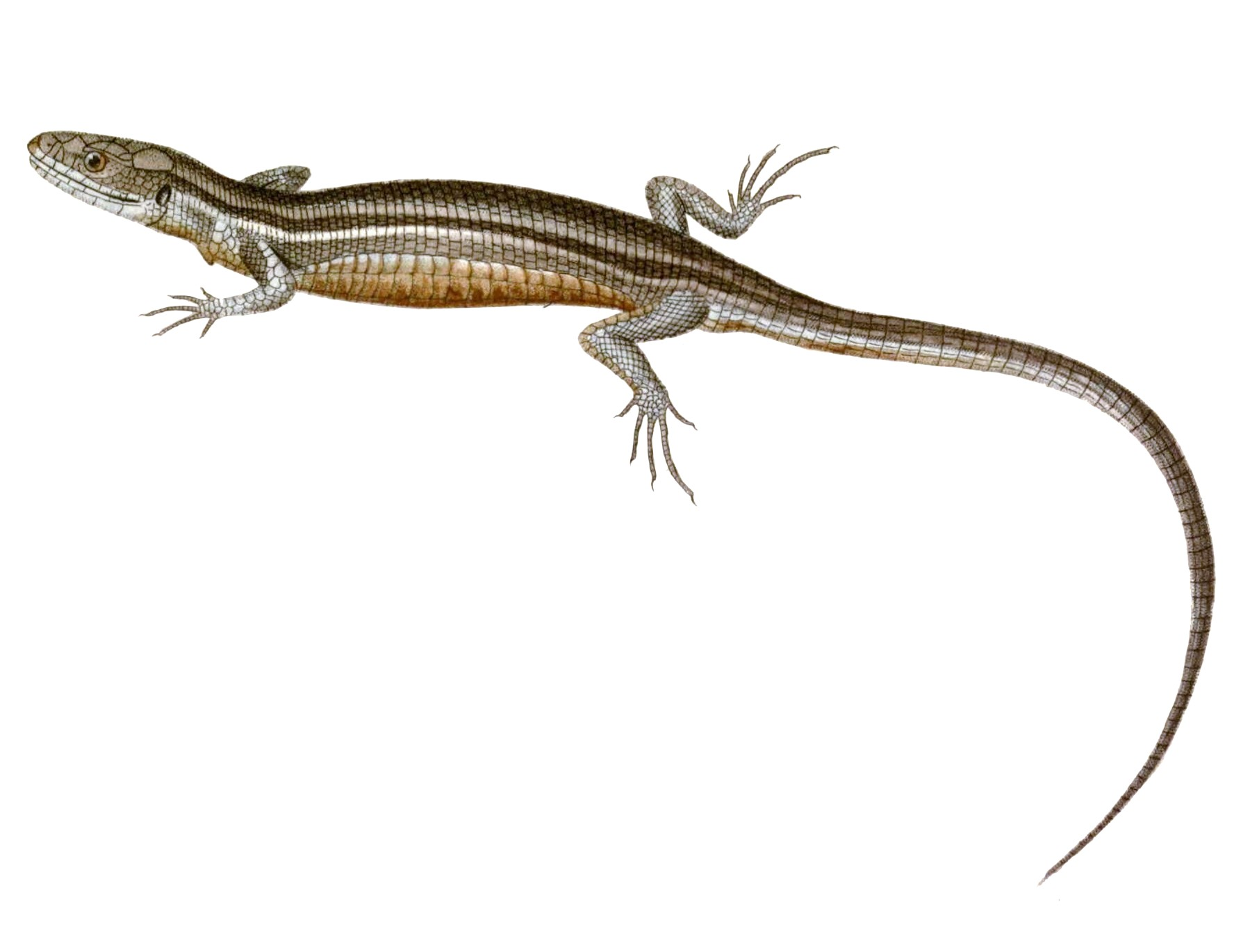
Zootoca vivipara
- in Louis Pierre Vieillot (1807). Histoire naturelle des oiseaux de l'Amérique septentrionale: contenant un grand nombre d'espèces décrites ou figurées pour la première fois. Vol. 1. Paris: Desray.
- in Louis Pierre Vieillot (1807). Histoire naturelle des oiseaux de l'Amérique septentrionale: contenant un grand nombre d'espèces décrites ou figurées pour la première fois. Vol. 2. Paris: Desray.
- in Louis Pierre Vieillot (1805–1809). Histoire naturelle des plus beaux oiseaux chanteurs de la zone torride, avec la manière de les élever dans tous les climats de l'Europe, et d'obtenir la propagation de ces jolies familles. Paris: Crapelet pour J. E. Gabriel Dufour.
- in Marie Jules César le Lorgne de Savigny (1809). Description de l'Égypte ou recueil des observations et des recherches qui on été faites en l'Égypte pendant l'expedition de l'armée francaise. Vol. 1. Paris: Imprimerie Royal.
- in Félix de Azara, Charles Athanase Walckenaer, Georges Cuvier, Charles Nicolas Sigisbert Sonnini de Manoncourt (1809). Voyages dans l'Amérique Méridionale, par Don Félix de Azara. Depuis 1781 jusqu'en 1801; contenant la description géographique, politique et civile du Paraguay et de la rivière de la Plata; l'histoire de la découverte et de la conquête de ces contrées; des détails nombreux sur leur histoire naturelle, et sur les peuples sauvages qui les habitent. Publiés d'après les manuscrits de l'auteur, avec une notice sur sa vie et ses écrits par C.A. Walckenaer; enrichis de notes par G. Cuvier. Suivis de L'histoire naturelle des oiseaux du Paraguay et de la Plata, par le même auteur, traduite d'après l'original espagnol, et augementée d'un grand nombre de notes par M. Sonnini; accompagnés d'un atlas de vingt-cinq planches. Vol. 2. Paris: Dentu.
- in André Marie Constant Duméril, Anselme Gaëtan Desmarest (1816–1830). Dictionnaire des sciences naturelles, dans lequel on traite méthodiquement des différens êtres de la nature, considérés soit en eux-mêmes, d'après l'état actuel de nos connoissances, soit relativement à l'utilité qu'en peuvent retirer la médecine, l'agriculture, le commerce et les artes. Suivi d'une biographie des plus célèbres naturalistes. Paris: F.G. Levrault.
- in Henri Marie Ducrotay de Blainville (1816–1830). Dictionnaire des sciences naturelles, dans lequel on traite méthodiquement des différens êtres de la nature, considérés soit en eux-mêmes, d'après l'état actuel de nos connoissances, soit relativement à l'utilité qu'en peuvent retirer la médecine, l'agriculture, le commerce et les artes. Suivi d'une biographie des plus célèbres naturalistes. Paris: F.G. Levrault.
- in Henri Marie Ducrotay de Blainville (1816–1830). Dictionnaire des sciences naturelles, dans lequel on traite méthodiquement des différens êtres de la nature, considérés soit en eux-mêmes, d'après l'état actuel de nos connoissances, soit relativement à l'utilité qu'en peuvent retirer la médecine, l'agriculture, le commerce et les artes. Suivi d'une biographie des plus célèbres naturalistes. Paris: F.G. Levrault.
- in André Jean François Marie Brochant de Villers, Alexandre Brongniart (1816–1830). Dictionnaire des sciences naturelles, dans lequel on traite méthodiquement des différens êtres de la nature, considérés soit en eux-mêmes, d'après l'état actuel de nos connoissances, soit relativement à l'utilité qu'en peuvent retirer la médecine, l'agriculture, le commerce et les artes. Suivi d'une biographie des plus célèbres naturalistes. Paris: F.G. Levrault.
- in Charles Dumont de Sainte Croix (1816–1830). Dictionnaire des sciences naturelles, dans lequel on traite méthodiquement des différens êtres de la nature, considérés soit en eux-mêmes, d'après l'état actuel de nos connoissances, soit relativement à l'utilité qu'en peuvent retirer la médecine, l'agriculture, le commerce et les artes. Suivi d'une biographie des plus célèbres naturalistes. Paris: F.G. Levrault.
- in Frédéric Cuvier (1816–1830). Dictionnaire des sciences naturelles, dans lequel on traite méthodiquement des différens êtres de la nature, considérés soit en eux-mêmes, d'après l'état actuel de nos connoissances, soit relativement à l'utilité qu'en peuvent retirer la médecine, l'agriculture, le commerce et les artes. Suivi d'une biographie des plus célèbres naturalistes. Paris: F.G. Levrault.
- in Hippolyte Cloquet (1816–1830). Dictionnaire des sciences naturelles, dans lequel on traite méthodiquement des différens êtres de la nature, considérés soit en eux-mêmes, d'après l'état actuel de nos connoissances, soit relativement à l'utilité qu'en peuvent retirer la médecine, l'agriculture, le commerce et les artes. Suivi d'une biographie des plus célèbres naturalistes. Paris: F.G. Levrault.
- in Marie Jules César le Lorgne de Savigny (1817). Description de l'Égypte ou recueil des observations et des recherches qui on été faites en l'Égypte pendant l'expedition de l'armée francaise. Vol. 2. Paris: Imprimerie Royal.
- in Bernard Germain Étienne Médard de La Ville-sur-Illon, comte de La Cépède (1818). Oeuvres complètes de Buffon, Mises en ordre, précédées d'une Notice sur la vie de l'auteur, et suivies d'un Discours intitulè: Vue générale des progrès de plusieurs branches des sciences naturelles depuis le Milieu du dernier siècle. Vol. 6 - Nouvelle èdition (Les Animeaux Domestiques). Paris: Rapet et Cie.
- in Bernard Germain Étienne Médard de La Ville-sur-Illon, comte de La Cépède (1818). Oeuvres complètes de Buffon, Mises en ordre, précédées d'une Notice sur la vie de l'auteur, et suivies d'un Discours intitulè: Vue générale des progrès de plusieurs branches des sciences naturelles depuis le Milieu du dernier siècle. Vol. 7 - Nouvelle èdition (Mammifères). Paris: Rapet et Cie.
- in Bernard Germain Étienne Médard de La Ville-sur-Illon, comte de La Cépède (1818). Oeuvres complètes de Buffon, Mises en ordre, précédées d'une Notice sur la vie de l'auteur, et suivies d'un Discours intitulè: Vue générale des progrès de plusieurs branches des sciences naturelles depuis le Milieu du dernier siècle. Vol. 8 - Nouvelle èdition (Mammifères). Paris: Rapet et Cie.
- in Bernard Germain Étienne Médard de La Ville-sur-Illon, comte de La Cépède (1818). Oeuvres complètes de Buffon, Mises en ordre, précédées d'une Notice sur la vie de l'auteur, et suivies d'un Discours intitulè: Vue générale des progrès de plusieurs branches des sciences naturelles depuis le Milieu du dernier siècle. Vol. 9 - Nouvelle èdition (Oiseaux). Paris: Rapet et Cie.
- in Bernard Germain Étienne Médard de La Ville-sur-Illon, comte de La Cépède (1818). Oeuvres complètes de Buffon, Mises en ordre, précédées d'une Notice sur la vie de l'auteur, et suivies d'un Discours intitulè: Vue générale des progrès de plusieurs branches des sciences naturelles depuis le Milieu du dernier siècle. Vol. 10 - Nouvelle èdition (Oiseaux). Paris: Rapet et Cie.
- in Bernard Germain Étienne Médard de La Ville-sur-Illon, comte de La Cépède (1818). Oeuvres complètes de Buffon, Mises en ordre, précédées d'une Notice sur la vie de l'auteur, et suivies d'un Discours intitulè: Vue générale des progrès de plusieurs branches des sciences naturelles depuis le Milieu du dernier siècle. Vol. 11 - Nouvelle èdition (Oiseaux). Paris: Rapet et Cie.
- in Bernard Germain Étienne Médard de La Ville-sur-Illon, comte de La Cépède (1818). Oeuvres complètes de Buffon, Mises en ordre, précédées d'une Notice sur la vie de l'auteur, et suivies d'un Discours intitulè: Vue générale des progrès de plusieurs branches des sciences naturelles depuis le Milieu du dernier siècle. Vol. 12 - Nouvelle èdition (Oiseaux). Paris: Rapet et Cie.
- in Bernard Germain Étienne Médard de La Ville-sur-Illon, comte de La Cépède (1819). Histoire naturelle des quadrupèdes-ovipares, par M. Le Compte de Lacépède suit et complément des Oeuvres de Buffon (avec vingt-deux nouvelle Planches en Taille-Douce). Vol. 1. Paris: Rapet.
- in Bernard Germain Étienne Médard de La Ville-sur-Illon, comte de La Cépède (1819). Histoire naturelle des poissons, par M. Le Compte de Lacépède suit et complément des Oeuvres de Buffon (avec vingt-quatre nouvelle Planches en Taille-Douce). Vol. 2. Paris: Rapet.
- in Bernard Germain Étienne Médard de La Ville-sur-Illon, comte de La Cépède (1819). Histoire naturelle des poissons, par M. Le Compte de Lacépède suit et complément des Oeuvres de Buffon (avec vingt-quatre nouvelle Planches en Taille-Douce). Vol. 3. Paris: Rapet.
- in Bernard Germain Étienne Médard de La Ville-sur-Illon, comte de La Cépède (1819). Histoire naturelle des poissons, par M. Le Compte de Lacépède suit et complément des Oeuvres de Buffon (avec vingt-deux nouvelle Planches en Taille-Douce). Vol. 4. Paris: Rapet.
- in Bernard Germain Étienne Médard de La Ville-sur-Illon, comte de La Cépède (1819). Histoire naturelle des poissons, par M. Le Compte de Lacépède suit et complément des Oeuvres de Buffon (avec vingt-trois nouvelle Planches en Taille-Douce). Vol. 5. Paris: Rapet.
- in Louis Jean Pierre Vieillot, Anselme Gaëtan Desmarest, Henri Marie Ducrotay de Blainville, Jean-Guillaume Audinet-Serville, Amédée Louis Michel Le Peletier de Saint-Fargeau, Charles Athanase Walckenaer (1821). Faune française, ou Histoire naturelle, générale et particulière des animaux qui se trouvent en France, constamment ou passagèrement, à la surface du sol, dans les eaux qui le baignent, et dans le lit. Vol. 12. Straßburg: F.-G. Leverault.
- in Louis de Freycinet (1824). Voyage autour du monde: entrepris par ordre du roi, sous le Ministère et Conformément aux Instruction de S. Exc. M. Le Vicomte du Bouchage, Secrétaire d'état au département de Marine, exécuté sur les corvettes de S. M. l'Oranie et la Physicienne, pendant les années 1817, 1818, 1819 et 1820; Publié sous les Auspices de S. E. M. Le Compte Corbière, Secrétaire d'état de l'intérieur, pour la partie Historique et la sciences naturelles, et de S. E. M. Le Marquis de Clermont-Tonnerre, Secrétaire d'état de la Marine des Colonies, pour la partie Nautique. Vol. 3. Paris: Taille-Douce de Langlois.
- in François Fulgis Chevallier (1824). Histoire des graphidées, accompagnée d'un tableau analytique des genres. Par F.-F. Chevallier, docteur en médecine de la faculté de Paris, membre de plusieurs sociétés savantes. Ouvrage renfermant des observations anatomiques et physiologiques sur ces végétaux; avec des figures dessinées et coloriées d'après nature, par MM. Prêtre et P. Duménil, peintres d'histoire naturelle (Paul Chrétien Romain Constant Duménil). Paris: Firmin Didot Père et fils.
- in Georg Friedrich Wilhelm Meyer (1825). Die Entwickelung: Metamorphose und Fortpflanzung der Flechten in Anwendung auf ihre systematische Anordnung und zur Nachweisung des allgemeinen Ganges der Formbildung in den untern Ordnungen cryptogamischer Gewächse. Göttingen: Vandenhoeck und Ruprecht.
- in Joseph Antoine Risso (1826). Histoire naturelle des principales productions de l'Europe méridionale et particulièrement de celles des environs de Nice et des Alpes Maritimes. Vol. 2. Paris: F.G. Levrault.
- in Joseph Antoine Risso (1826). Histoire naturelle des principales productions de l'Europe méridionale et particulièrement de celles des environs de Nice et des Alpes Maritimes. Vol. 3. Paris: F.G. Levrault.
- in Joseph Antoine Risso (1826). Histoire naturelle des principales productions de l'Europe méridionale et particulièrement de celles des environs de Nice et des Alpes Maritimes. Vol. 4. Paris: F.G. Levrault.
- in Joseph Antoine Risso (1826). Histoire naturelle des principales productions de l'Europe méridionale et particulièrement de celles des environs de Nice et des Alpes Maritimes. Vol. 5. Paris: F.G. Levrault.
- in Louis Isadore Duperrey (1826). Voyage autour du monde: exécuté par ordre du roi, sur la corvette de Sa Majesté, la Coquille, pendant les années 1822, 1823, 1824, et 1825: sous le Ministère et conformément aux instructions de S.E.M. le Marquis de Clermont. Vol. 5. Paris: Arthus Bertrand.
- in Louis Isadore Duperrey (1826). Voyage autour du monde: exécuté par ordre du roi, sur la corvette de Sa Majesté, la Coquille, pendant les années 1822, 1823, 1824, et 1825: sous le Ministère et conformément aux instructions de S.E.M. le Marquis de Clermont. Vol. 5. Paris: Arthus Bertrand.
- in Louis Isadore Duperrey (1826). Voyage autour du monde: exécuté par ordre du roi, sur la corvette de Sa Majesté, la Coquille, pendant les années 1822, 1823, 1824, et 1825: sous le Ministère et conformément aux instructions de S.E.M. le Marquis de Clermont. Vol. 5. Paris: Arthus Bertrand.
- in Henri Marie Ducrotay de Blainville (1827). Manuel de malacologie et de conchyliologie. Vol. 2. Paris: F. G. Levrault.
- in René Primevère Lesson (1828). Atlas d'ornithologie, composé de 129 planches représentant les Oiseaux décrit dans l'ouvrage Manuel d'ornithologie, ou Description des genres et des principales espèces d'oiseaux. Paris: Roret.
- in Bernard Germain Étienne Médard de La Ville-sur-Illon, comte de La Cépède (1829–1834). Oeuvres complètes de Buffon avec le suites, par M. de Lacépède; précédées d'une Notice sur la vie et la ouvrages de Buffon, Par M. le Baron Cuvier. Paris: Lecointe.
- in René Primevère Lesson (1830). Centurie zoologique, ou, Choix d'animaux rares, nouveaux ou imparfaitement connus: enrichi de planches inédites, dessinées d'après nature par M. Prêtre, gravées et coloriées avec le plus grand soin (80 plates Prêtre, Prêtre René Primevère Lesson, Prêtre nach Lesson). Paris: F.G. Levrault.
- in René Primevère Lesson (1831). Traité d'ornithologie, ou, Tableau méthodique des ordres, sous-ordres, familles, tribus, genres, sous-genres et races d'oiseaux: ouvrage entièrement neuf, formant le catalogue le plus complet des espèces réunies dans les collections publiques de la France. Paris: F.G. Levrault.
- in Amédée Louis Michel Le Peletier de Saint-Fargeau (1836–1846). Histoire naturelle des insectes. Hyménoptère. Paris: Librairie encyclopédique de Roret.
- in Achille Richard (1837). Oeuvres complètes de Buffon, suivies de la classification comparée de Cuvier, Lesson etc. Vol. 3. Paris: Pourrat frères.
- in Achille Richard (1837). Oeuvres complètes de Buffon, suivies de la classification comparée de Cuvier, Lesson etc. Vol. 4. Paris: Pourrat frères.
- in Achille Richard (1837). Oeuvres complètes de Buffon, suivies de la classification comparée de Cuvier, Lesson etc. Vol. 5. Paris: Pourrat frères.
- in Charles Athanase Walckenaer; François-Louis-Paul Gervais (1837). Histoire naturelle des insectes. Aptères. Paris: Librairie encyclopédique de Roret.
- in René Primevère Lesson (1829). Histoire naturelle des oiseaux-mouches, ouvrage orné de planches desinées et gravée par les meilleurs artistes et dédié A S. A. R. Mademoiselle 81 plates (Prêtre, Antoine Germaine Bévalet, Marie Clémence Lesson nach Louis Jean Pierre Vieillot, Antoine Charles Vauthier nach William Swainson, Pancrace Bessa, Elisa Zoé Dumont de Sainte Croix). Paris: Arthus Bertrand.
- in René Primevère Lesson (1830–1832). Histoire naturelle des colibris: suivie d'un supplément à l'Histoire naturelle des oiseaux-mouches: ouvrage orné de planches dessinées et gravées par les meilleurs artistes: et dédié A.M. le Baron Cuvier 66 plates (Prêtre, Antoine Germaine Bévalet). Paris: Arthus Bertrand.
- in René Primevère Lesson (1834–1835). Les Trochilidées ou les Colibris et Les Oiseaux-Mouches Suivis d'un index général dans lequel sont décrites et classées méthodiquement toutes les races et espèces du genere Trochilus. Ouvrage orné de planches dessinées et gravées par les meilleurs artistes 66 plates (Prêtre, Antoine Germaine Bévalet). Paris: Arthus Bertrand.
- in René Primevère Lesson (1834–1835). Histoire naturelle des oiseaux de paradis et des épimaques; Ouvrage orné de planches, dessinées par les meilleurs artistes 40 plates (Prêtre, Paul Louis Oudart). Paris: Arthus Bertrand.
- in René Primevère Lesson; Charles Bélanger (1834). Voyage aux Indes orientales et à la Chine: fait par ordre du Roi, depuis 1774 jusqu'en 1781: dans lequel on traite des moeurs, de la religion, des sciences & des arts des Indiens, des Chinois, des Pégouins & des Madégasses, suivi d'observations sur le Cap de Bonne-Espérance, les isles de France & de Bourbon, les Maldives, Ceylan, Malacca, les Philippines & les Moluques & de recherches sur l'histoire naturelle de ces pays. Paris: Arthus Bertrand.
- in René Primevère Lesson (1832–1835). Illustrations de zoologie, ou Recueil de figures d'animaux peintes d'après nature. Paris: Arthus Bertrand.
- in Pierre-Louis Duclos (1835). Histoire naturelle générale et particulière de tous les genres de coquilles univalves marines: à l'état vivant et fossile, publiée par monographies, ou, description et classification méthodique de toutes les espèces connues jusqu'à ce jour, représentées en couleur avec la figure et l'anatomie d'un assez grand nombre de mollusques nouvellement découverts. Paris: Typographie de Firmin Didot frères.
- Henri Marie Ducrotay de Blainville (1835). Description de quelques espèces de reptiles de la Californie, précédée de l'analyse d'un système général d'Erpétologie et d'Amphibiologie. Vol. 4. Roret. pp. 233–296.
- in Coenraad Jacob Temminck, Guillaume Michel Jérôme Meiffren de Laugier, Baron von Chartrouse (1838). Nouveau recueil de planches coloriées d'oiseaux: pour servir de suite et de complément aux planches enluminées de Buffon (d'après les dessins de MM. Huet et Prêtre, Peintre attachés au Muséum d'histoire naturelle). Vol. 1. Paris: F.G. Levrault.
- in Coenraad Jacob Temminck, Guillaume Michel Jérôme Meiffren de Laugier, Baron von Chartrouse (1838). Nouveau recueil de planches coloriées d'oiseaux: pour servir de suite et de complément aux planches enluminées de Buffon (d'après les dessins de MM. Huet et Prêtre, Peintre attachés au Muséum d'histoire naturelle). Vol. 2. Paris: F.G. Levrault.
- in Coenraad Jacob Temminck, Guillaume Michel Jérôme Meiffren de Laugier, Baron von Chartrouse (1838). Nouveau recueil de planches coloriées d'oiseaux: pour servir de suite et de complément aux planches enluminées de Buffon (d'après les dessins de MM. Huet et Prêtre, Peintre attachés au Muséum d'histoire naturelle). Vol. 3. Paris: F.G. Levrault.
- in Coenraad Jacob Temminck, Guillaume Michel Jérôme Meiffren de Laugier, Baron von Chartrouse (1838). Nouveau recueil de planches coloriées d'oiseaux: pour servir de suite et de complément aux planches enluminées de Buffon (d'après les dessins de MM. Huet et Prêtre, Peintre attachés au Muséum d'histoire naturelle). Vol. 4. Paris: F.G. Levrault.
- in Coenraad Jacob Temminck, Guillaume Michel Jérôme Meiffren de Laugier, Baron von Chartrouse (1838). Nouveau recueil de planches coloriées d'oiseaux: pour servir de suite et de complément aux planches enluminées de Buffon (d'après les dessins de MM. Huet et Prêtre, Peintre attachés au Muséum d'histoire naturelle). Vol. 5. Paris: F.G. Levrault.
- in Ramón de la Sagra, Alcide Dessalines Orbigny (1839–1856). Histoire physique, politique et naturelle de l'ile de Cuba. Paris: Bertrand.
- in Ramón de la Sagra, Jean Theodore Cocteau, Georges Bibron (1839–1856). Histoire physique, politique et naturelle de l'ile de Cuba. Paris: Bertrand.
- in Alcide Dessalines d 'Orbigny (1839–1856). Histoire physique, politique et naturelle de l'ile de Cuba. Paris: Bertrand.
- in Jules Bourcier (1840). Description d'une espèce nouvelle d'oiseaux-mouches (Tafel Calothorax lucifer Syn: Le Labrador (Ornismya labrador)). Vol. 2. pp. 389–392.
- in Jules Bourcier (1840). Description et figures des trois espèces nouvelles d'oiseaux-mouches (Tafel: Calypte costae Syn: Le de Costa (Ornismya labrador), Metallura tyrianthina Syn: Le D'Allard (Ornismya allardi), Chaetocercus jourdanii Syn: Le Jourdan (Ornismya jordani)). Vol. 3. pp. 225–228.
- in Jules Paul Benjamin Delessert, übersetzt von Jean Charles Chenu (1841). Recueil de Coquilles décrites par Lamarck dans son histoire naturelle des animaux sans vertèbres et non encore figurées. Paris: Fortin, Masson et Cie.
- in Isidore Geoffroy Saint-Hilaire (1841). Essais de zoologie générale ou Mémoires et notices sur la zoologie générale, l'anthropologie, et l'histoire de la science. Paris: A la Librairie encyclopédique de Roret (1 Tafel Jacques-Christophe Werner, 7 plates Pêtre).
- in Jean Charles Chenu (1841). Illustrations conchyliologiques ou description et figures de toutes les coquilles connues vivantes et fossiles, classées suivant le système de Lamarck modifié d'après les progrès de la science et comprenant les genres nouveaux et les espèces rècemment découvertes (PDF). Vol. 1. Paris: A. Franck.
- in Georg Friedrich Wilhelm Meyer (1842). Flora des Königreichs Hannover – Beschreibender Theil enthaltend die in Kupfer gestochenen Abbildungen zu den vollständigen Naturbeschreibungen der im Königreiche wildwachsenden und im freien Felde angebauten Gewächse. Göttingen/Berlin: Prêtre.
- in Jules Bourcier (1842). Description et figures des nouvelles espèces nouvelled d'oiseaux-mouches (Tafel: Coeligena bonapartei Syn: Le Bonaparte (Ornismya Bonapartei), Chaetocercus heliodor Syn: L'Héliodore (Ornismya Heliodori)). Vol. 5. pp. 307–309.
- in Jules Bourcier (1842). Description du nid de L'Oiseaux-Mouche Audebert (Tafel: Nest von Chlorestes notata Syn: Nid de L'Audebert (Ornismya audeberti)). Vol. 5. p. 310.
- in Jean Charles Chenu (1842). Illustrations conchyliologiques ou description et figures de toutes les coquilles connues vivantes et fossiles, classées suivant le système de Lamarck modifié d'après les progrès de la science et comprenant les genres nouveaux et les espèces rècemment découvertes (PDF). Vol. 2. Paris: A. Franck.
- Jules Bourcier; Étienne Mulsant (1843). Description et figures de plusieurs espèces nouvelles d'oiseaux-mouches (Tafel: Thalurania colombica Syn: Le Colomb (Ornismya colombica)). Vol. 6. pp. 36–49.
- in René Primevère Lesson (1843). Histoire naturelle des zoophytes. Acalèphes (12 plates Prêtre, Prêtre nach Denis-Henry Borromée, Thomas Marie Joseph Gousset). Paris: Librairie encyclopédique de Roret.
- in Jean Charles Chenu (1847). Leçons élémentaires sur l'histoire naturelle des animaux : précédées d'un aperçu général sur la zoologie. Paris: J. J. Dubochet, Le Chevalier et Ce.
