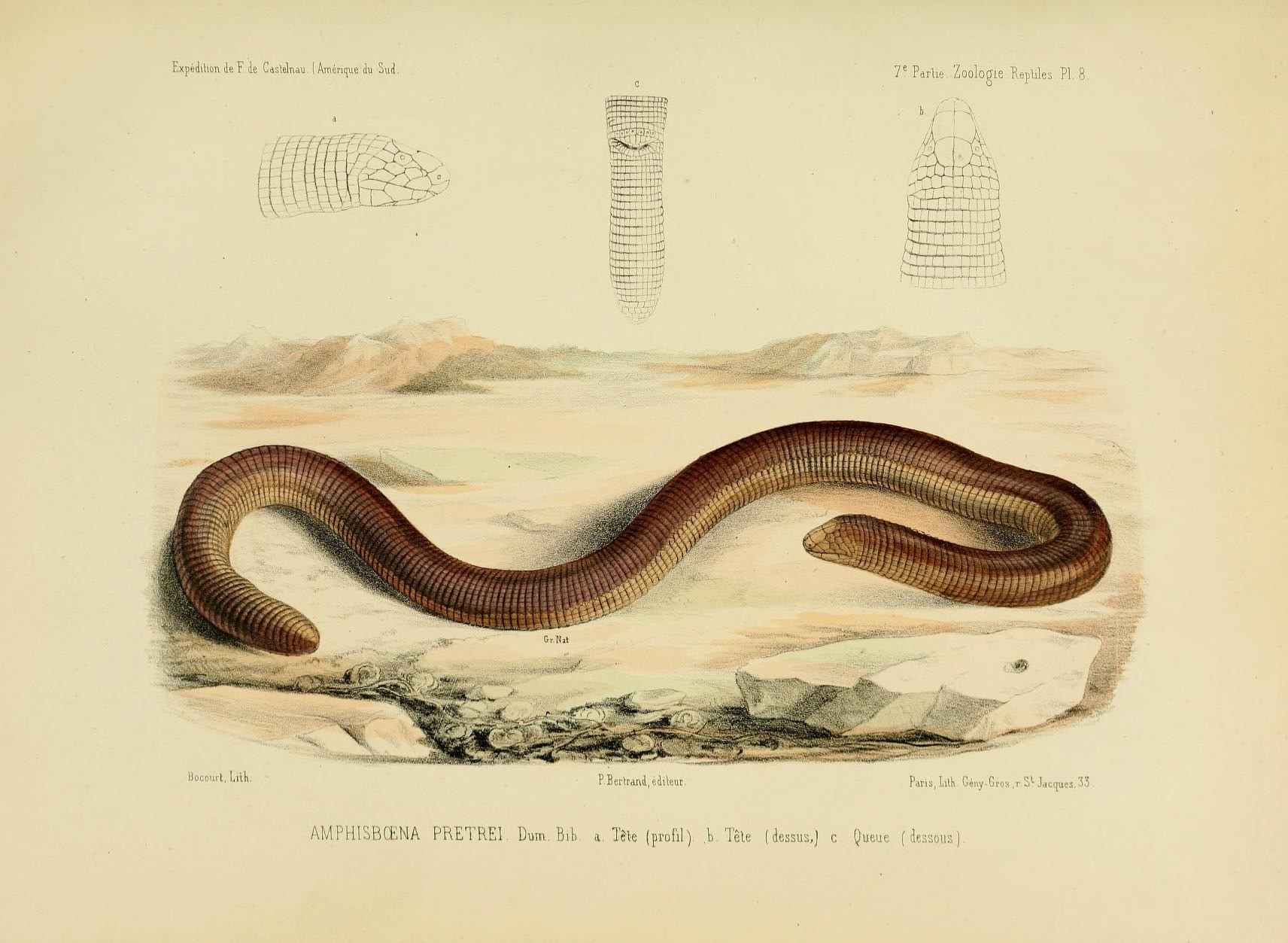

Conservation status
- Least Concern (IUCN 3.1)

Scientific classification
- Kingdom: Animalia
- Phylum: Chordata
- Class: Reptilia
- Order: Squamata
- Clade: Amphisbaenia
- Family: Amphisbaenidae
- Genus: Amphisbaena
- Species: A. pretrei

Binomial name
- Amphisbaena pretrei A.M.C. Duméril & Bibron, 1839
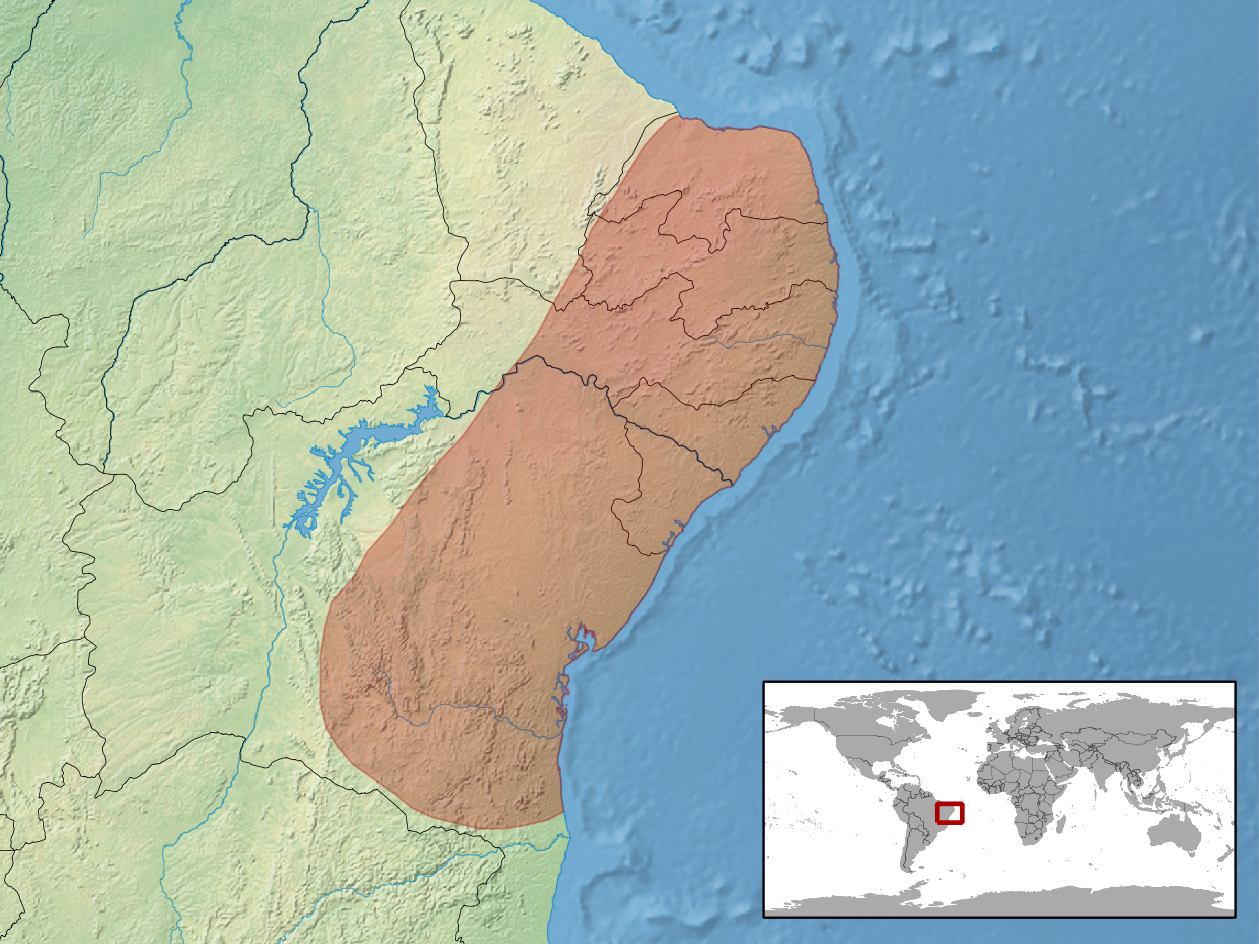

= Rio Grande worm lizard =

Species of lizard

The Rio Grande worm lizard (Amphisbaena pretrei) is a species of worm lizard in the family Amphisbaenidae. The species is endemic to Brazil.

== Etymology ==
The specific name, pretrei, is in honor of French artist Jean-Gabriel Prêtre.

== Description ==
A. pretrei is reddish brown dorsally, and white ventrally. It may attain a snout-to-vent length of 28 cm (11 in), with a tail 3.4 cm (1.3 in) long.

== Reproduction ==
A. pretrei is oviparous.
