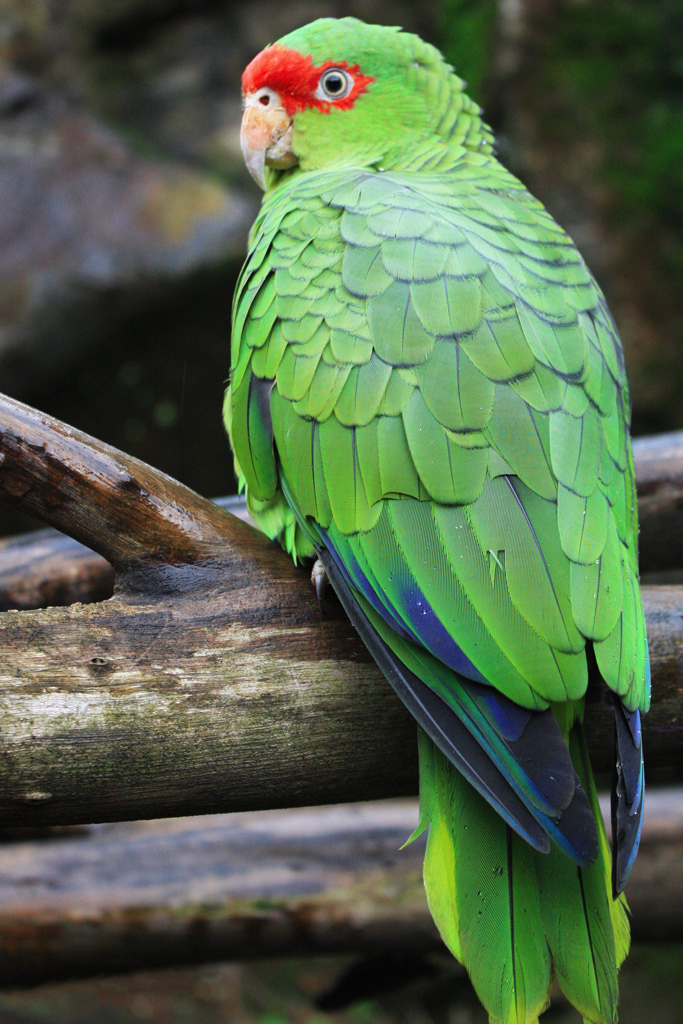
- In Brazil

Conservation status
- Vulnerable (IUCN 3.1)
- CITES Appendix I

Scientific classification
- Kingdom: Animalia
- Phylum: Chordata
- Class: Aves
- Order: Psittaciformes
- Family: Psittacidae
- Genus: Amazona
- Species: A. pretrei

Binomial name
- Amazona pretrei (Temminck, 1830)

= Red-spectacled amazon =

Species of bird

The red-spectacled amazon (Amazona pretrei) is a species of parrot in the family Psittacidae. It is found in Argentina, Brazil, and Paraguay.

Its natural habitats are subtropical or tropical dry forest, subtropical or tropical moist lowland forest, subtropical or tropical moist montane forest, dry savanna, and plantations. It is threatened by habitat loss.

The Red-spectacled Amazon migrates seasonally from the northern region of the state of Rio Grande do Sul to the south-eastern state of Santa Catarina to feed on the mass-produced seeds of the Brazilian Pine.

The species is distributed in the area of the frontier between southern Corrientes province in Argentina and the state of Rio Grande do Sul, Brazil.

They are a quiet species with a relaxed disposition.

== Description ==
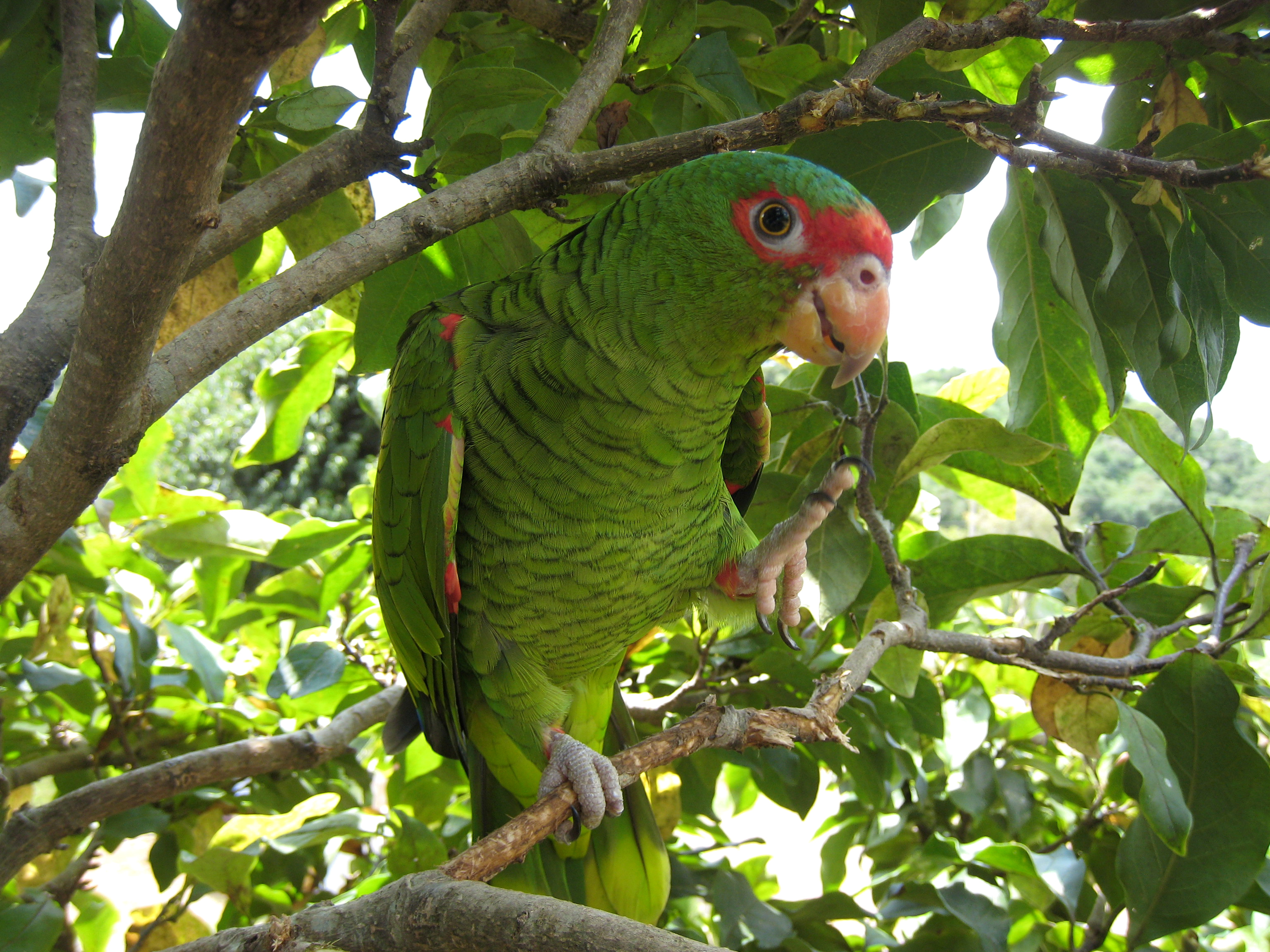
In Rio Grande do Sul, Brazil

The red-spectacled amazon is 32 cm (13 in) long. It is mostly green with some sparse red spots on head, variable extent of red on forehead, lores and around eyes, white eyerings, red on the bend of the wings with blue tips to secondaries and primaries and yellowish bill. Females have less red on the bend of the wing.

Diet: 90 percent of the Red-spectacled amazon's diet that inhabits the wild contains Angustifolia seeds, those in captivity, their diets consist of vegetables along with Araucaria seeds.

== Conservation and threats ==
The red-spectacled amazon is a declining species as it is highly threatened by the destruction of the Aruacaria moist forests and the illegal exotic pet trade. An analysis of the extinct Amazona pretrei population records reveals that the species disappeared due to severe habitat loss, and in the past, the parrot's geographical range was at least 10% larger than the current range.

The red-spectacled amazon is prized for its colorful feathers, mimicry ability, exotic appeal, and relative rarity, so eggs and live parrots are frequently smuggled from the wild and bred in captivity. It is estimated that nearly 500 chicks are stolen from their nests and sold in Brazilian cities every year.
