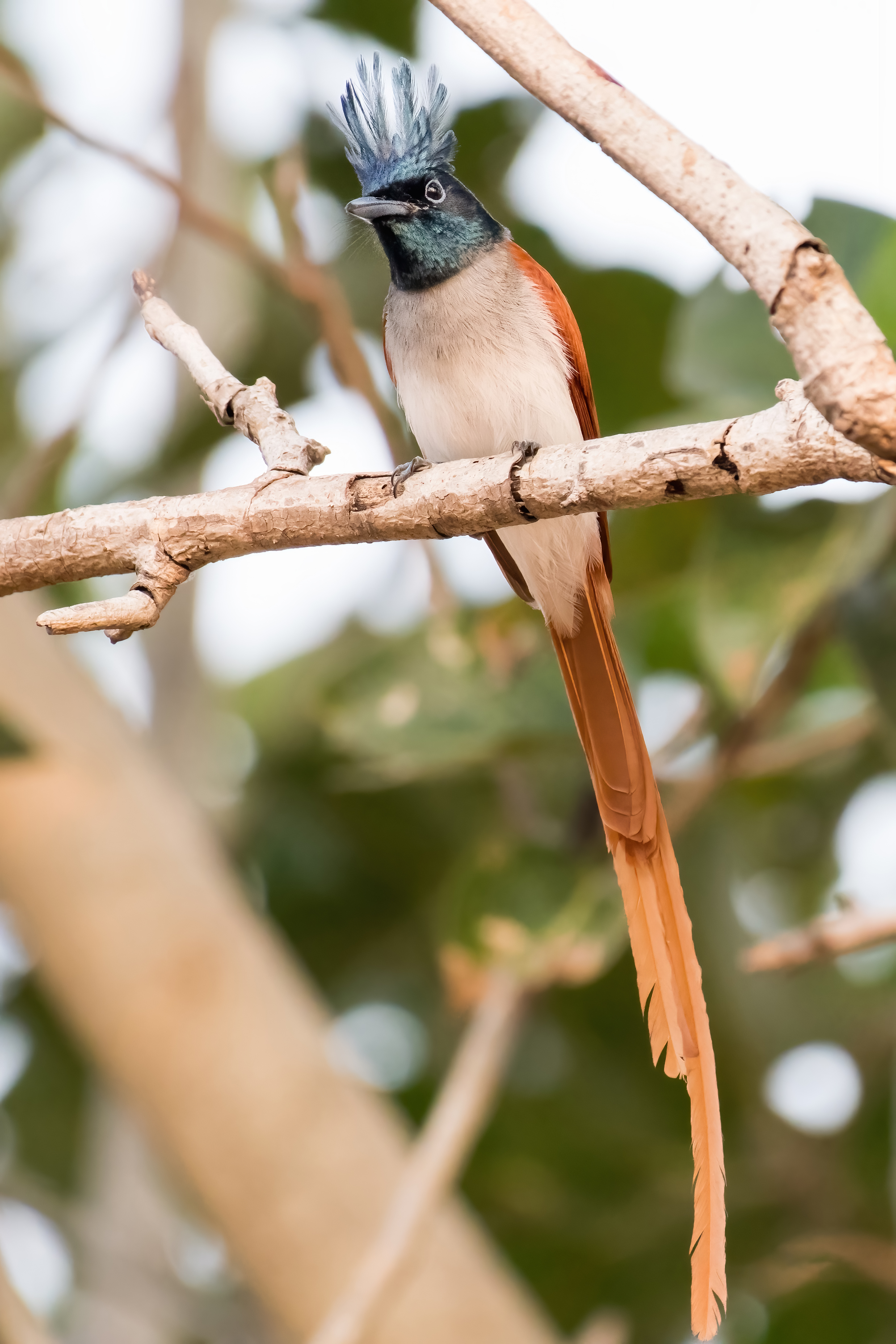
- Adult male
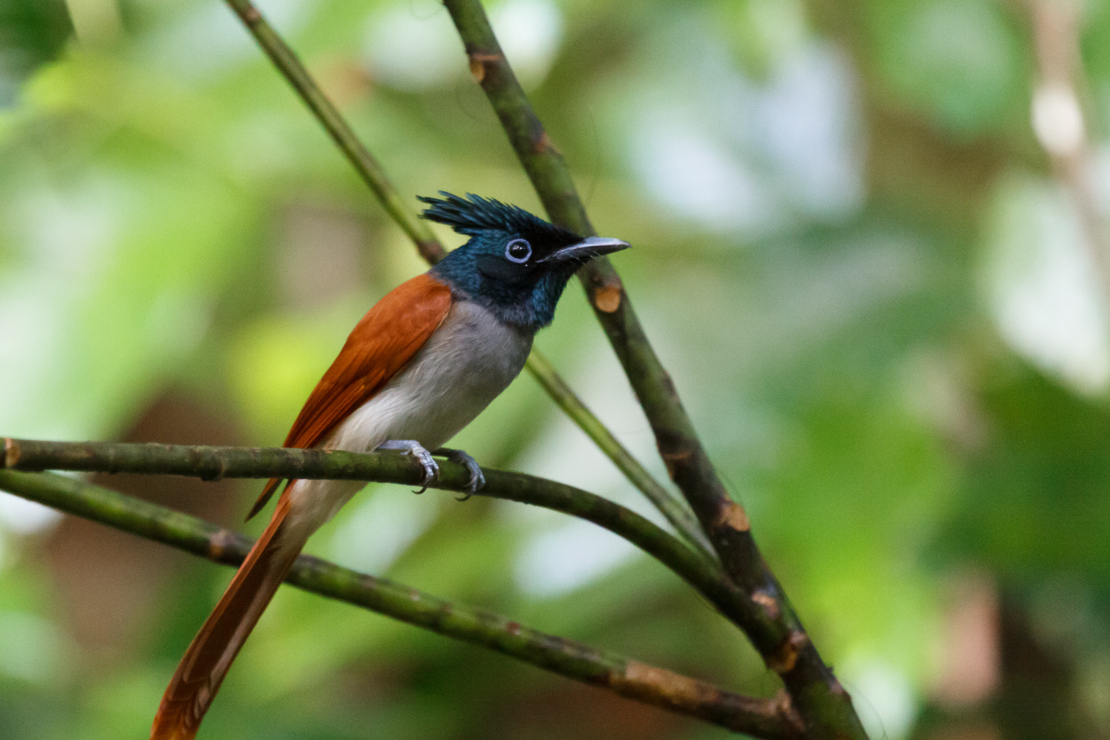
- Female

Conservation status
- Least Concern (IUCN 3.1)

Scientific classification
- Kingdom: Animalia
- Phylum: Chordata
- Class: Aves
- Order: Passeriformes
- Family: Monarchidae
- Genus: Terpsiphone
- Species: T. paradisi

Binomial name
- Terpsiphone paradisi (Linnaeus, 1758)

Subspecies
- See text

Synonyms
- Muscicapa paradisi Linnaeus, 1766, Corvus paradisi Linnaeus, 1758; Tchitrea paradisi (Linnaeus, 1758)

= Indian paradise flycatcher =

Species of bird

The Indian paradise flycatcher (Terpsiphone paradisi) is a medium-sized passerine bird in the monarch flycatcher family, Monarchidae. As the global population is considered stable, it has been listed as Least Concern on the IUCN Red List since 2004. It is native to the Indian subcontinent, with resident and breeding populations in most of Bangladesh, India and Sri Lanka, as well as parts of Afghanistan, Bhutan, China, Myanmar, Nepal, Pakistan, Tajikistan and Turkmenistan.

The Indian paradise flycatcher has a length of 20–50 cm (7.9–19.7 in) from beak to tail. Males have elongated central tail feathers, and a black and rufous plumage in some populations, while others have white plumage. Females are short-tailed with rufous wings and a black head. Indian paradise flycatchers feed on insects, including grasshoppers, butterflies and praying mantises, as well as flies. The Indian paradise flycatcher typically captures prey in the air, kills it by hitting it on a rock, and then extracts the inner parts. often below a densely canopied tree.

== Taxonomy ==
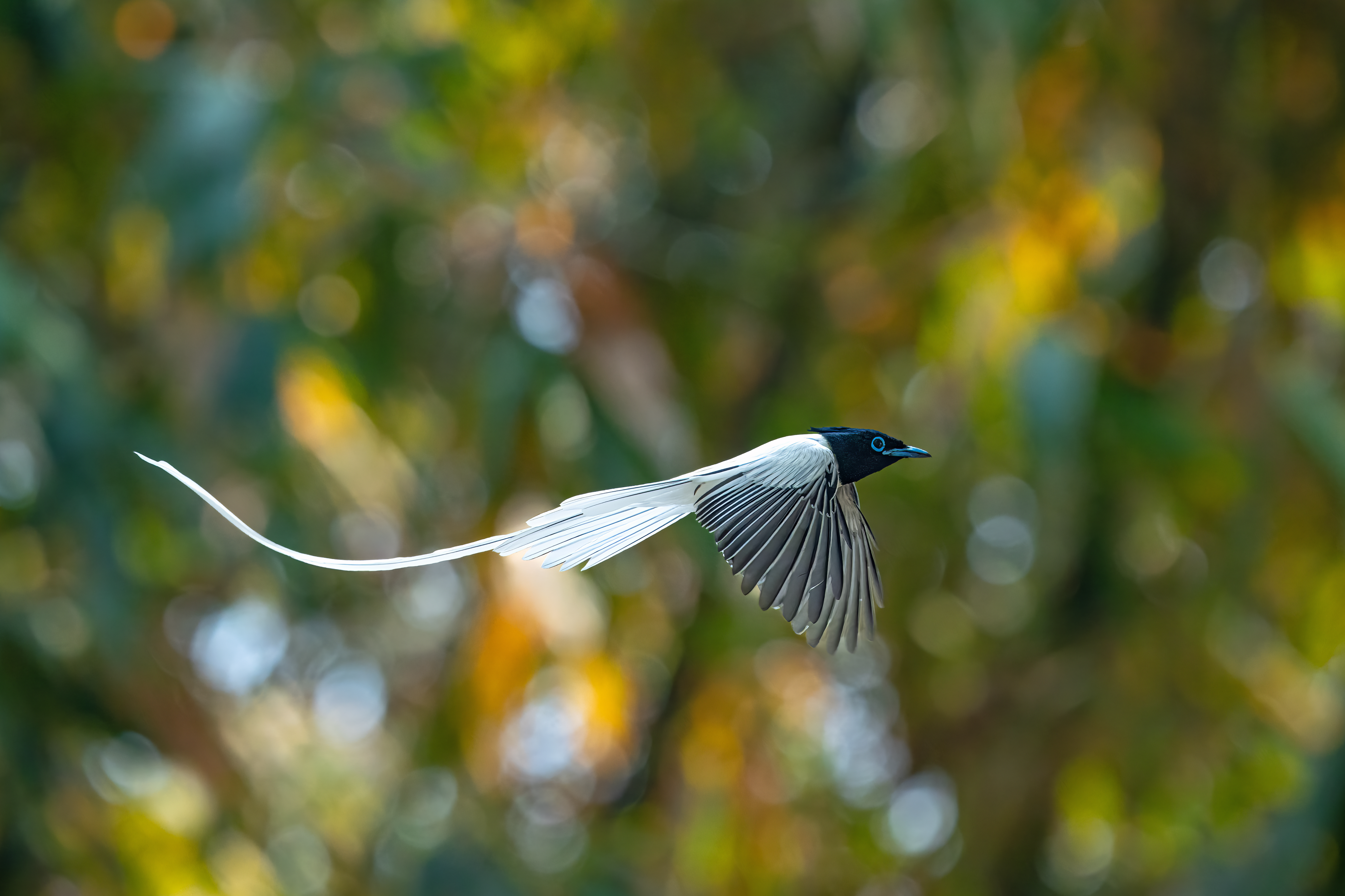
In flight

The Indian paradise flycatcher was formally described in 1758 by the Swedish naturalist Carl Linnaeus in the tenth edition of his Systema Naturae under the binomial name Corvus paradisi. The Indian paradise flycatcher is now one of 17 paradise flycatchers placed in the genus Terpsiphone that was introduced in 1827 by the German zoologist Constantin Gloger. Paradise-flycatchers were formerly classified with the Old World flycatcher in the family Muscicapidae, but are now placed in the family Monarchidae together with monarch flycatchers. Until 2015, the Indian paradise flycatcher, Blyth's paradise flycatcher, and the Amur paradise flycatcher were all considered conspecific, and together called Asian paradise flycatcher.

=== Subspecies ===
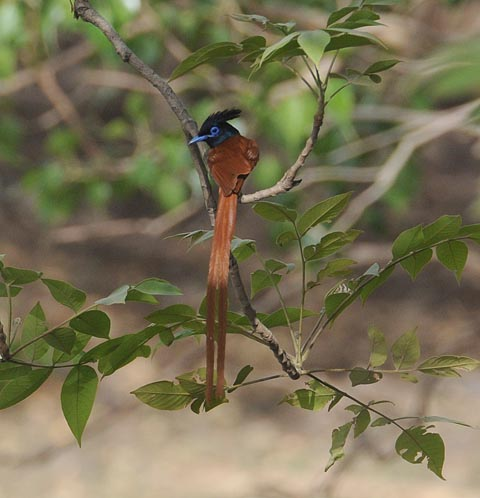
Sub-adult male Indian paradise flycatcher in Ranthambhore National Park

Three subspecies are recognized:

- T. p. paradisi (Linnaeus, 1758) breeds in central and southern India, central Bangladesh, and south-western Myanmar; populations occurring in Sri Lanka in the winter season are non-breeding.
- Himalayan paradise flycatcher (T. p. leucogaster) (Swainson, 1838) was initially described as a separate species. It breeds in the western Tian Shan, Afghanistan, northern Pakistan, and northwestern and central India, and western and central Nepal; populations in eastern Pakistan and in southern India migrate towards the foothills of the Himalayas in spring for breeding.
- Ceylon paradise flycatcher (T. p. ceylonensis) (Zarudny & Harms, 1912) occurs in Sri Lanka.

== Description ==
Adult Indian paradise flycatchers are 19–22 cm (7.5–8.7 in) long. Their heads are glossy black with a black crown and crest, their black bill round and sturdy, and their eyes black. Females are rufous on the back with a greyish throat and underparts. Their wings are 86–92 mm (3.4–3.6 in) long. Young males look very much like females but have a black throat and blue-ringed eyes. As adults, they develop up to 24 cm (9.4 in) long tail feathers with two central tail feathers growing up to 30 cm (12 in) long drooping streamers.

Young males are rufous and have short tails. They acquire long tails in their second or third year. Adult males are either predominantly bright rufous above or predominantly white. Some specimens show some degree of intermediacy between rufous and white. Long-tailed rufous birds are generally devoid of shaft streaks on the wing and tail feathers, while in white birds the shaft streaks, and sometimes the edges of the wing and tail feathers are black.

In the early 1960s (before the recognition of Blyth's and Amur paradise flycatchers as separate species), 680 long-tailed males were examined that are contained in collections of the British Museum of Natural History, Chicago Natural History Museum, Peabody Museum, Carnegie Museum, American Museum of Natural History, United States National Museum, and Royal Ontario Museum. The specimens came from almost the entire range of the species, though some areas were poorly represented. The relative frequency of the rufous and white plumage types varies geographically. Rufous birds are rare in the extreme southeastern part of the species' range. Throughout the Indian area and, to a lesser extent, in China, asymmetrically patterned intermediates occur. Intermediates are rare or absent throughout the rest of the range of the species. In general, long-tailed males are

- predominantly rufous with some white in wings and tail—collected in Turkestan, Kashmir, northern India, Punjab, Maharashtra, Sikkim, and in Sri Lanka
- predominantly rufous with some white in wings—collected in Iran, Afghanistan, Baluchistan, Punjab, Kashmir, northern and central India, Rajasthan, Maharashtra, Bihar, and Nepal
- predominantly rufous with some white in tail—collected in Punjab, northern and central India, Kolkata, Sri Lanka, and in the Upper Yangtze Valley in China
- predominantly white with some rufous in tail and wings—collected in Kashmir, Maharashtra, Sichuan, and North China
- predominantly white with some rufous in tail—collected in Maharashtra and Fuzhou, China
- predominantly white with back partly rufous—collected in Punjab and Chennai
- moulting from rufous into white plumage—collected in North Bihar

Possible interpretations of this phenomenon are: males may be polymorphic for rufous and white plumage colour; rufous birds may be sub-adults; and there may even be two sympatric species distinguishable only in the male.

== Distribution and habitat ==
The Indian paradise flycatcher is a migratory bird and spends the winter season in tropical Asia. In southern India and Sri Lanka especially the highlands and western parts of Sri Lanka, both locally breeding populations and visiting migrants occur in winter.

== Behaviour and ecology ==
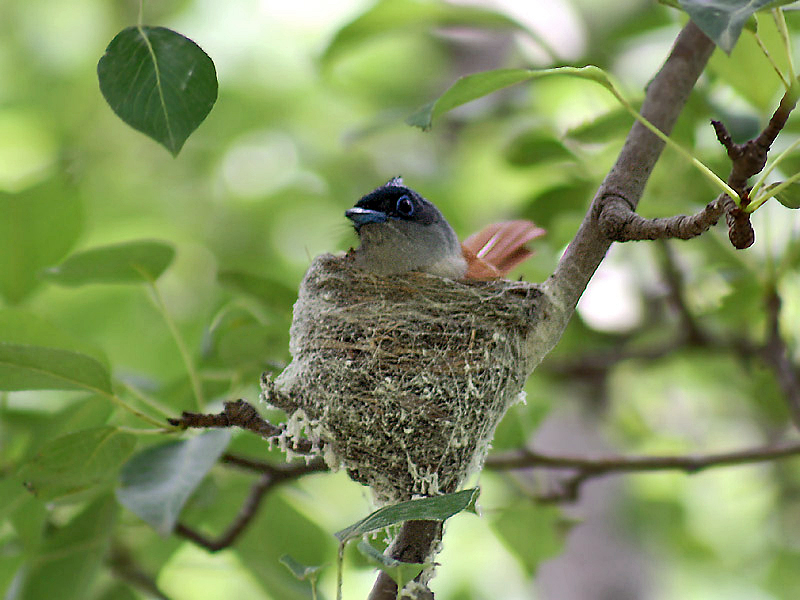
Female on nest

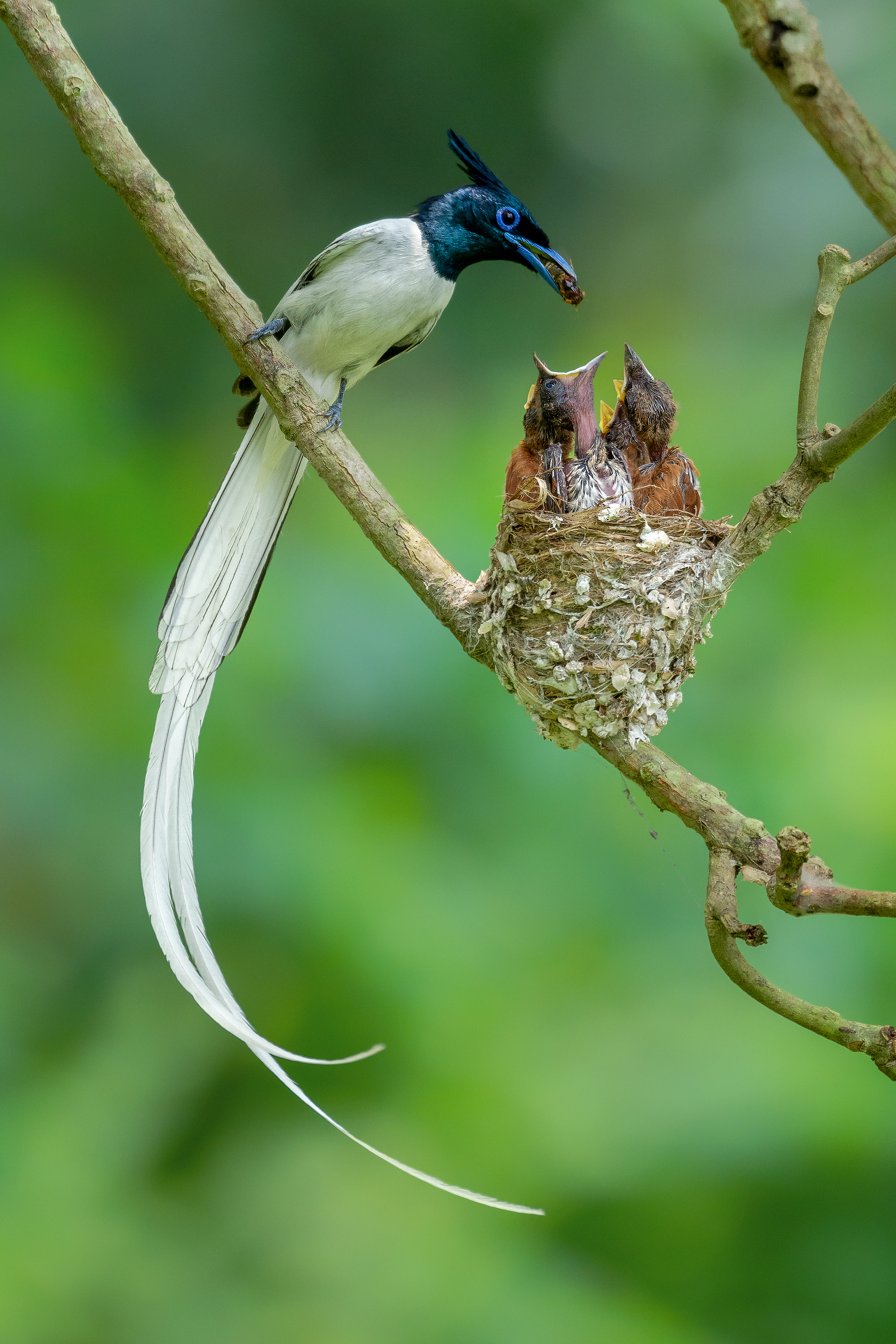
A male Paradise flycatcher feeding his chicks

Indian paradise flycatcher's breeding season lasts from May to July. Being socially monogamous, both males and females take part in nest-building, incubation, brooding, and feeding of the young. The incubation period lasts 14 to 16 days and the nestling period 9 to 12 days. The nest is sometimes built in the vicinity of a breeding pair of drongos, which keep predators away. The female lays up to four eggs in a neat cup nest made with twigs and spider webs on the end of a low branch. Chicks hatch in about 21 to 23 days. A case of interspecific feeding has been noted with paradise flycatcher chicks fed by Indian white-eyes.

== In culture ==
This bird is the state bird of Madhya Pradesh and is referred to as Doodhraj locally,
