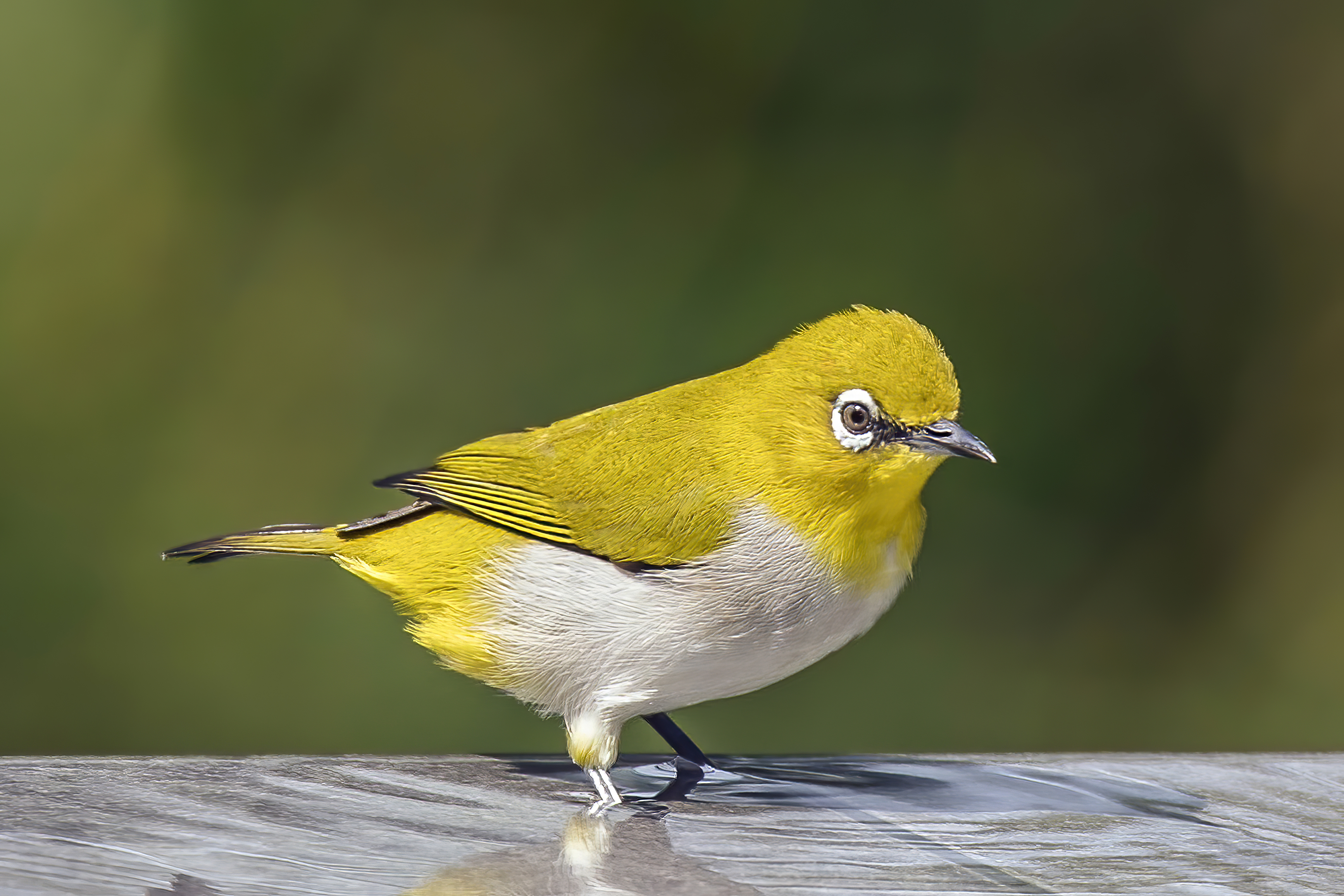
- Z. p. egregius, Sri Lanka

Conservation status
- Least Concern (IUCN 3.1)

Scientific classification
- Kingdom: Animalia
- Phylum: Chordata
- Class: Aves
- Order: Passeriformes
- Family: Zosteropidae
- Genus: Zosterops
- Species: Z. palpebrosus

Binomial name
- Zosterops palpebrosus (Temminck, 1824)

Synonyms
- Sylvia palpebrosa Zosterops palpebrosa

= Indian white-eye =

Species of bird

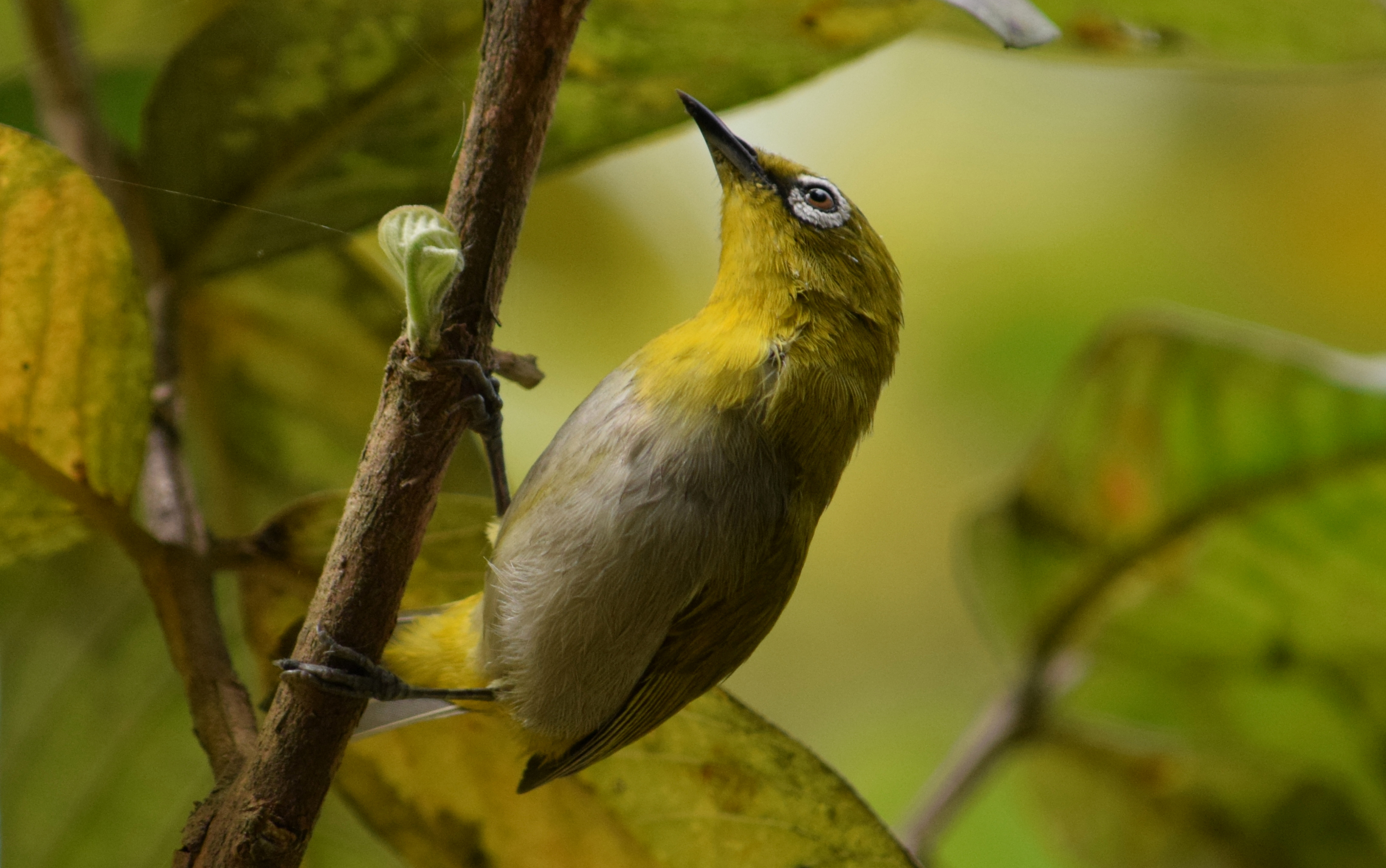
Indian white-eye in Kolkata outskirts

The Indian white-eye (Zosterops palpebrosus), formerly the Oriental white-eye, is a small species of passerine bird in the white-eye family. It is a resident breeder in open woodland on the Indian subcontinent. They forage in small groups, feeding on nectar and small insects. The distinctive white eye-ring and overall yellowish upperparts easily identify them. The range previously extended eastwards to Southeast Asia, Indonesia, and Malaysia. Their name was recently changed because previous members of Zosterops palpebrosus in Southeast Asia were reclassified as a new species, making the Indian White-eye a more geographically accurate term for this species.

== Taxonomy ==
The Indian white-eye was described by the Dutch zoologist Coenraad Jacob Temminck in 1824, based on a specimen collected in Bengal. He coined the binomial name Sylvia palpebrosa. The English and scientific names refer to the conspicuous ring of white feathers round the eyes, palpebrosus being Neo-Latin for "having prominent eyelids", from the Latin palpebrae "eyelids".

The English name of this species was changed from "Oriental white-eye" to "Indian white-eye" to more accurately reflect the geographic range following the reorganisation of the taxa with the introduction of Hume's white-eye (Zosterops auriventer), the warbling white-eye (Zosterops japonicus) and Swinhoe's white-eye (Zosterops simplex).

== Description ==
This bird is small (about 8–9 cm long) with yellowish olive upper parts, a white eye ring, a yellow throat, and a vent. The belly is whitish-grey, but may be yellow in some subspecies. The sexes look similar. The species is widespread and belongs to a superspecies complex that includes Zosterops japonicus, Zosterops meyeni, and possibly others. The group's taxonomy is still unclear, with some island populations distinctive while others lack strong support. The population from Flores, Indonesia, for instance, is found closer to the pale white-eye. The family itself is now questioned since they are nested along with the Stachyris babblers.

About eleven subspecies are well recognised; these include the nominate form (type locality Bengal, India), which is found from Oman and Arabia to Afghanistan, northern India, and extends into China and northern Myanmar. The population in the Western Ghats and hills of southern India is placed in the nilgiriensis group. In contrast salimalii of the Eastern Ghats hills (Shevaroy, Chitteri, Seshachalam, Nallamalai) is sometimes subsumed into the nominate race. The population of the plains of India, Laccadives and Sri Lanka are sometimes placed in egregius (= egregia) but is restricted by other works to the population in Sri Lanka. The populations in southern Myanmar, Thailand and Laos are placed in siamensis. The Nicobar Islands form the genus nicobaricus and are sometimes also used for the population on the Andaman Islands, which, however, is a distinctive and unnamed population. The populations from southern Thailand to western Cambodia are placed in williamsoni. Other Southeast Asian island forms include auriventer (=aureiventer), buxtoni, melanurus and unicus.

The occidentis race (now often subsumed into the nominate race) of the Western Himalayas has the upper side dark green, and the flanks are tinged brown. The form salimalii has a shorter bill and is brighter yellow-green above. Some authors consider the nominate race to be restricted to Sikkim, Bhutan, Assam and Yunnan and consider the peninsular race as occidentis (or amabilis if the form from Kathiawar described by Koelz is considered valid).

In Sri Lanka, race egregia is smaller and has a brighter back and throat than the endemic Sri Lanka white-eye, Zosterops ceylonensis found in the central hills.

== Distribution and habitat ==
The species is found in a wide range of habitats from scrub to moist forest. They sometimes occur in mangrove areas, such as in the Karachi region, Pakistan, and on islands they may lead a more insectivorous life. They are somewhat rare only in the drier desert regions of western India.

A feral population was detected in San Diego, California, in the 1980s and subsequently eradicated.

== Behaviour and ecology ==
Dawn song in Southern India

These white-eyes are sociable, forming flocks which only separate on the approach of the breeding season. They are highly arboreal and only rarely descend to the ground. The breeding season is February to September, but April is the peak breeding season and the compact cup nest is placed like a hammock on the fork of a branch. The nest is made of cobwebs, lichens, and plant fibre. The nest is built in about 4 days, and the two pale blue eggs are laid within a couple of days of each other. The eggs hatch in about 10 days. Both sexes take care of brooding the chicks, which fledge in about 10 days.

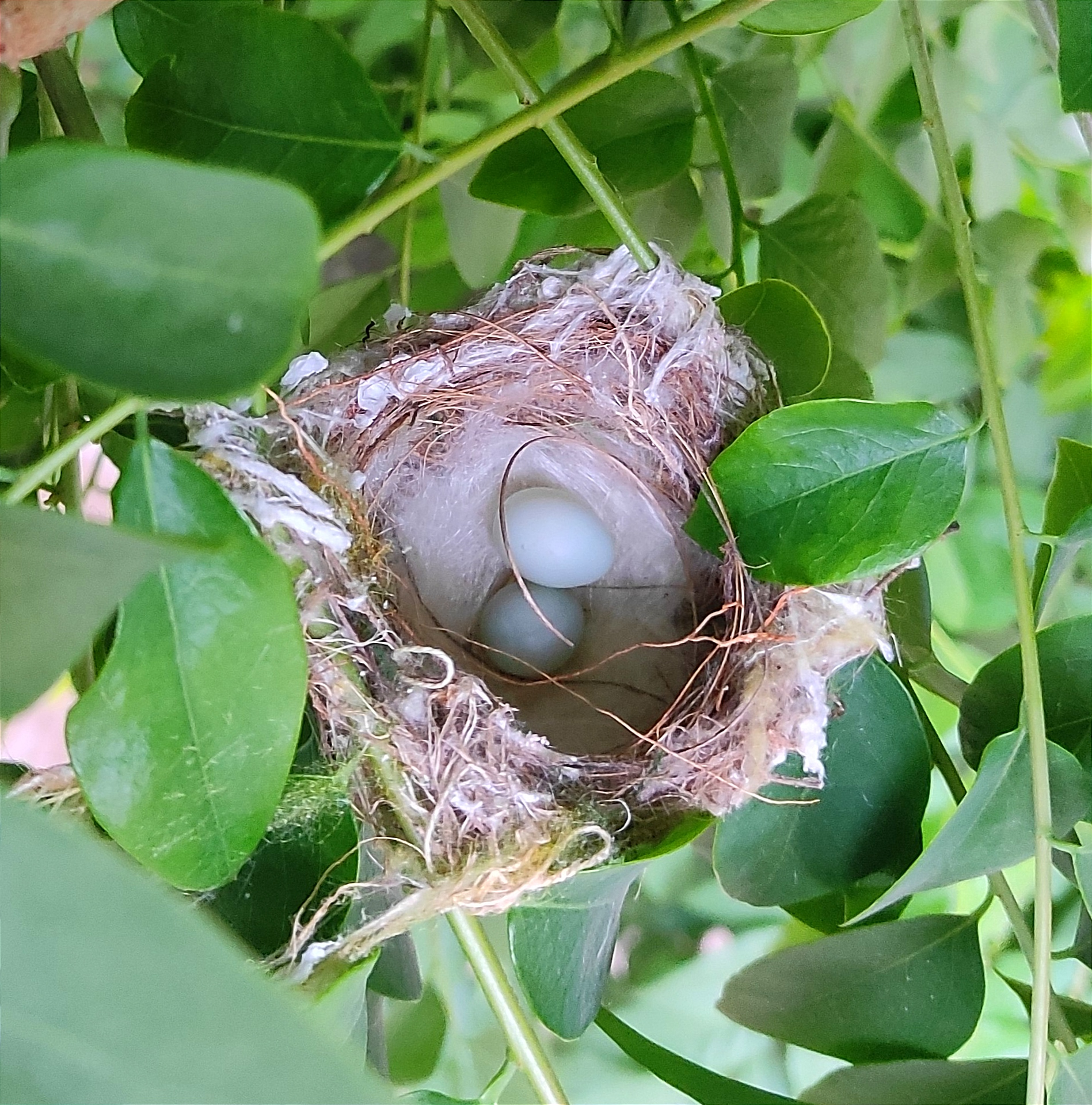
Indian white-eye nest in Bangalore, India

Though mainly insectivorous, the Indian white-eye will also eat nectar and fruits of various kinds.

They call frequently as they forage, and the usual contact call is a soft nasal cheer. They pollinate flowers when they visit them for flower insects (such as thrips) and possibly nectar (questioned) that form their diet. The forehead is sometimes coloured by poll, leading to mistaken identifications. They have been observed bathing in dew accumulated on leaves.

When nesting, they may mob palm squirrels, but being small birds, they are usually on the defensive. Their predators include bats (esp. Megaderma lyra) and birds such as the white-throated kingfisher. Endoparasitic Haemosporidia of the genus Haemoproteus and Dorisa have been isolated from the species, although these rarely cause death.

Like some other white-eyes, they sometimes steal nest material from the nests of other birds. Cases of interspecific feeding have been noted with white-eyes feeding the chicks of a paradise flycatcher.

Although not strong fliers, they can be carried by winds and storms to new areas, including offshore islands. A feral population of this species established itself in California during the 1980s, requiring their capture and destruction. They were captured by luring them with call playback and live decoys into mist nets.

== Gallery ==
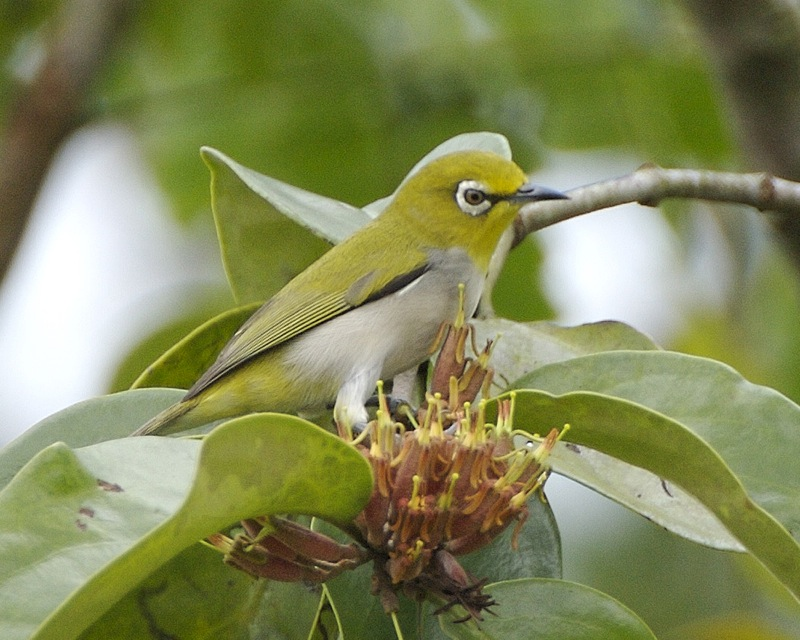
Z. p. williamsoni, Singapore

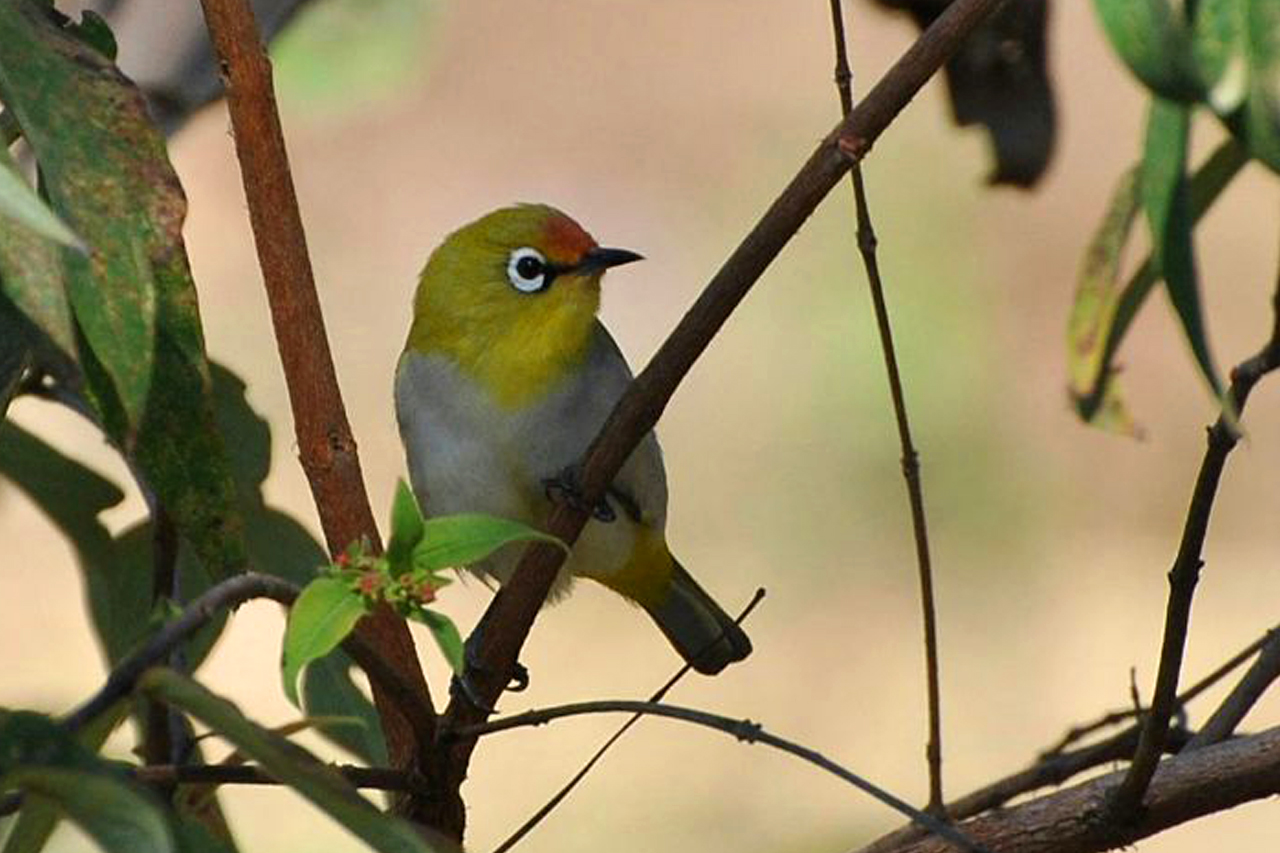
This bird in Maharashtra has an orange forehead due to pollen staining

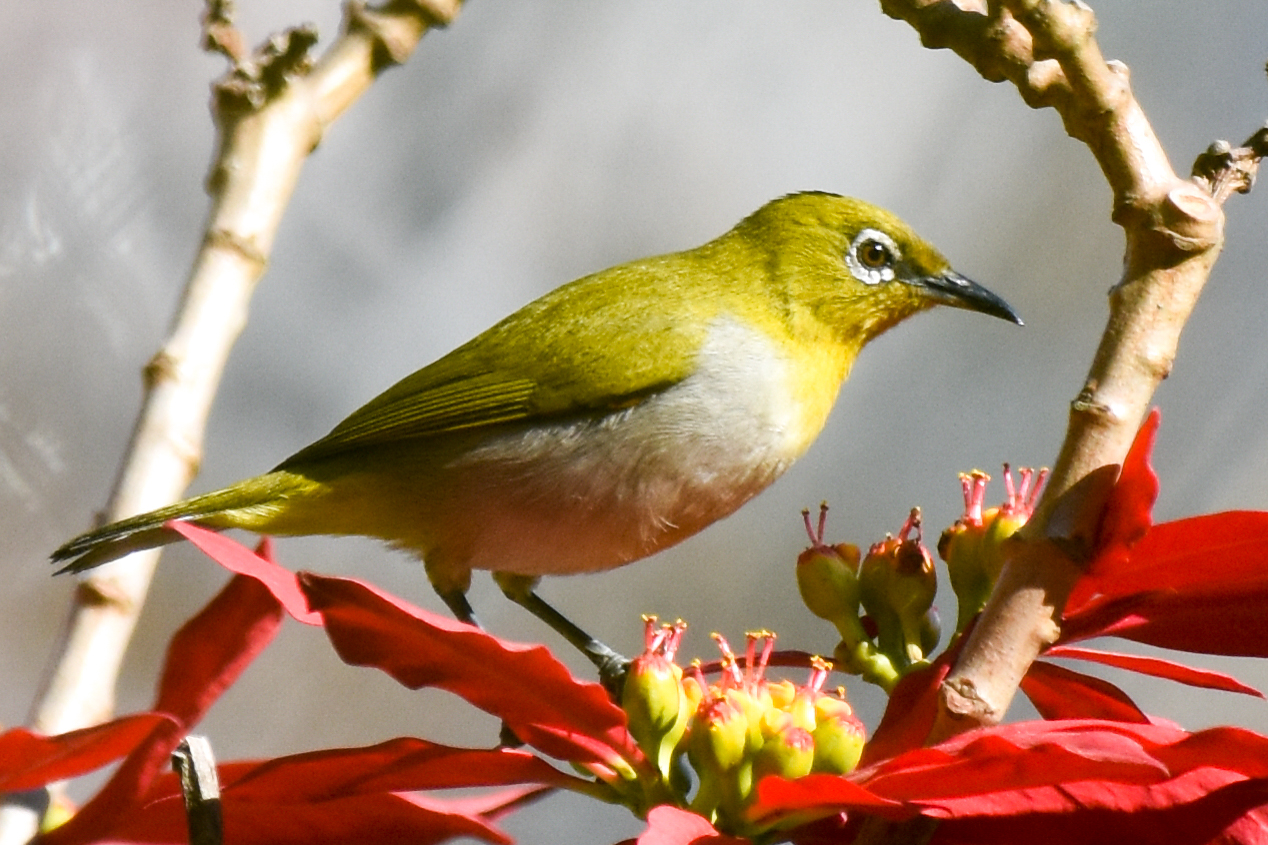
In Ooty (alt. 2,300m), The Nilgiris District, India

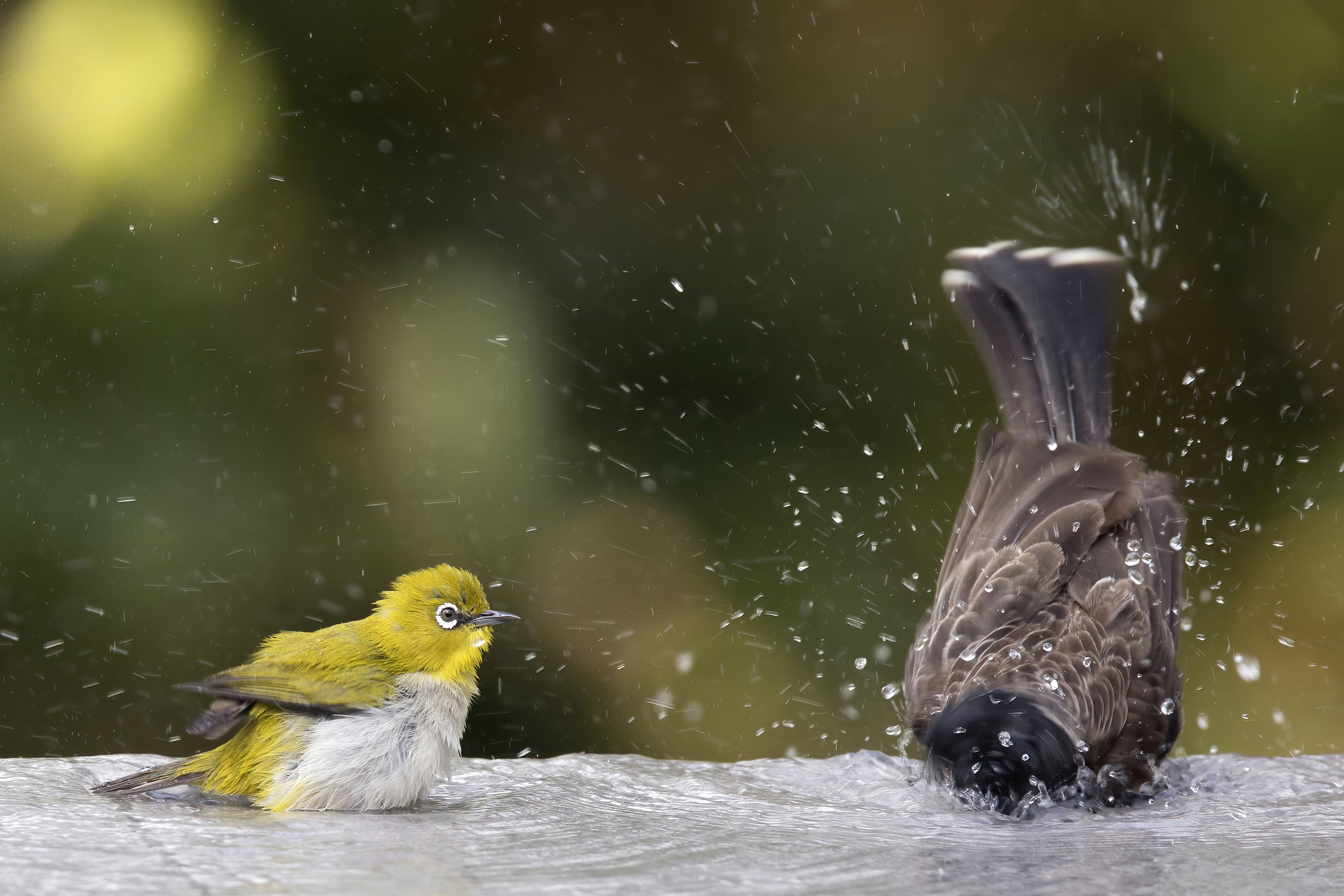
Bathing alongside red-vented bulbul in Sri Lanka

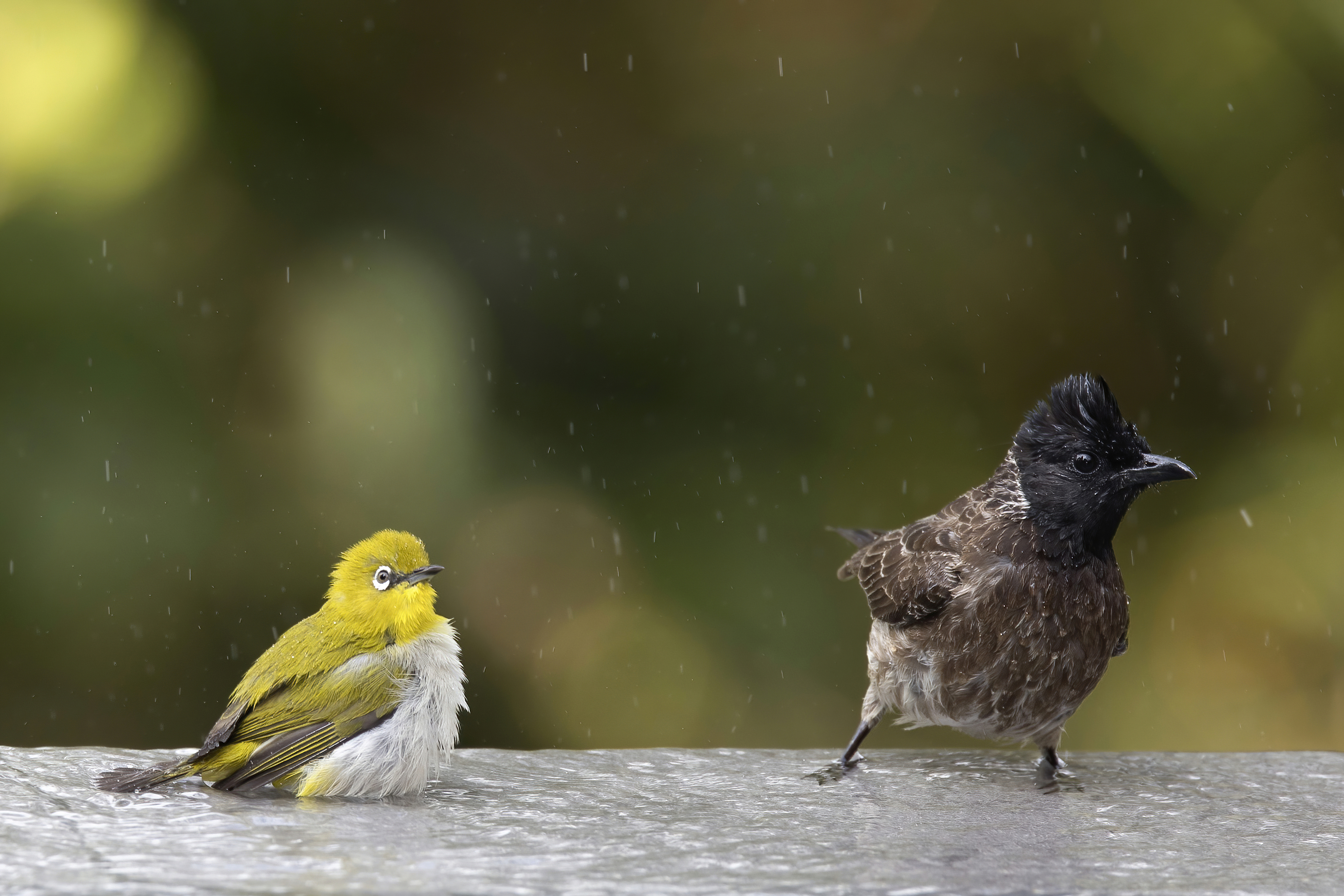
Indian white-eye and red-vented bulbul bathing near Galle, Sri Lanka

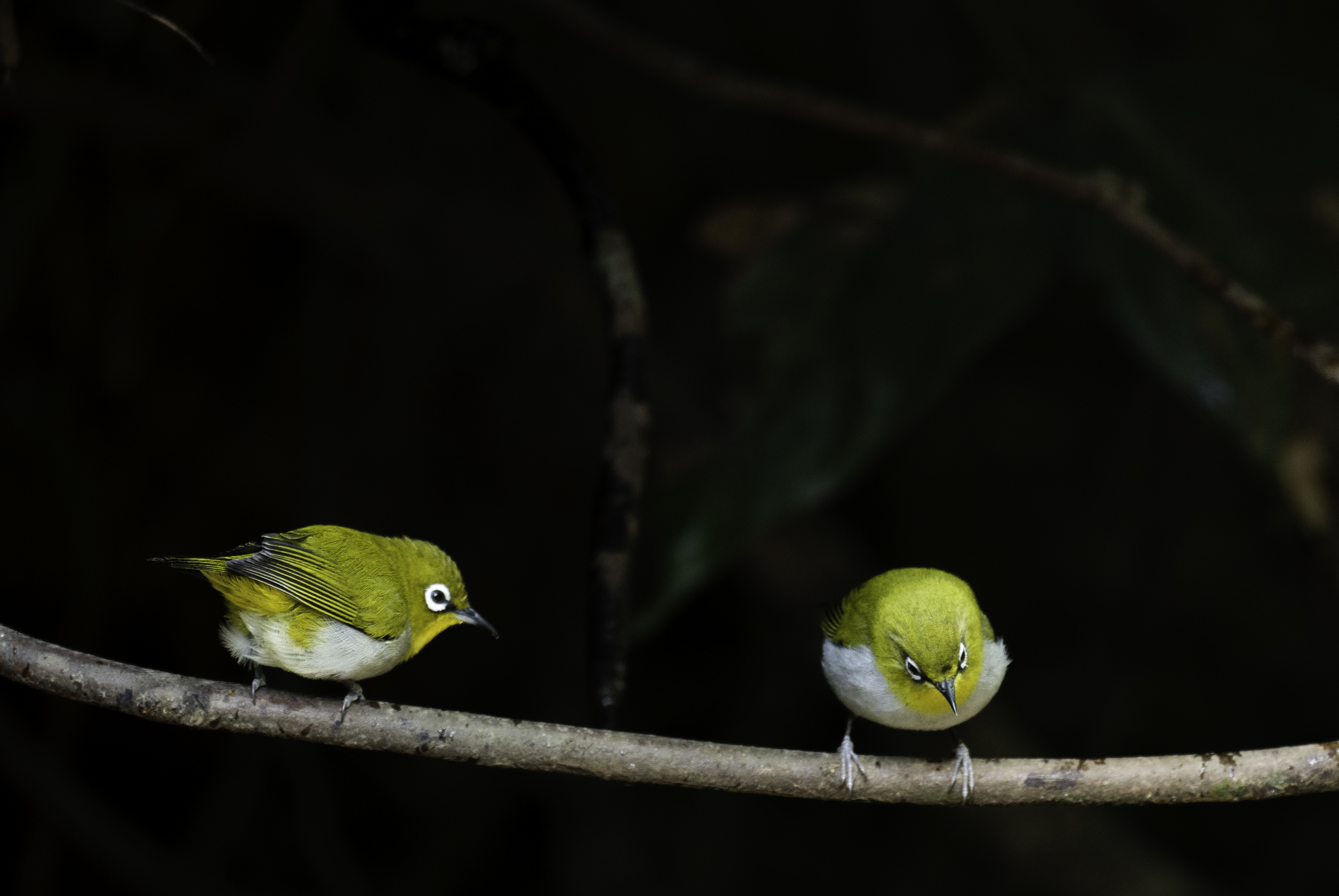
Pair in Assam, India
