= Blyth's paradise flycatcher =

Conservation status
- Least Concern (IUCN 3.1)

Scientific classification
- Kingdom: Animalia
- Phylum: Chordata
- Class: Aves
- Order: Passeriformes
- Family: Monarchidae
- Genus: Terpsiphone
- Species: T. affinis

Binomial name
- Terpsiphone affinis (Blyth, 1846)

Subspecies
- See text

Synonyms
- Tchitrea affinis

Species of bird

Blyth's paradise flycatcher (Terpsiphone affinis), also called the oriental paradise flycatcher, is a species of bird in the family Monarchidae. This species occupies evergreen broadleaf forests and forest edges, including secondary growth, gardens, and plantations, typically in lowland and foothill regions. Some populations undertake migratory movements.

It is native to northeast India, Indochina, Sumatra and Borneo. Formerly, it was considered a subspecies of the Asian paradise flycatcher until elevated to species rank by the IOC in 2015.

== Subspecies ==
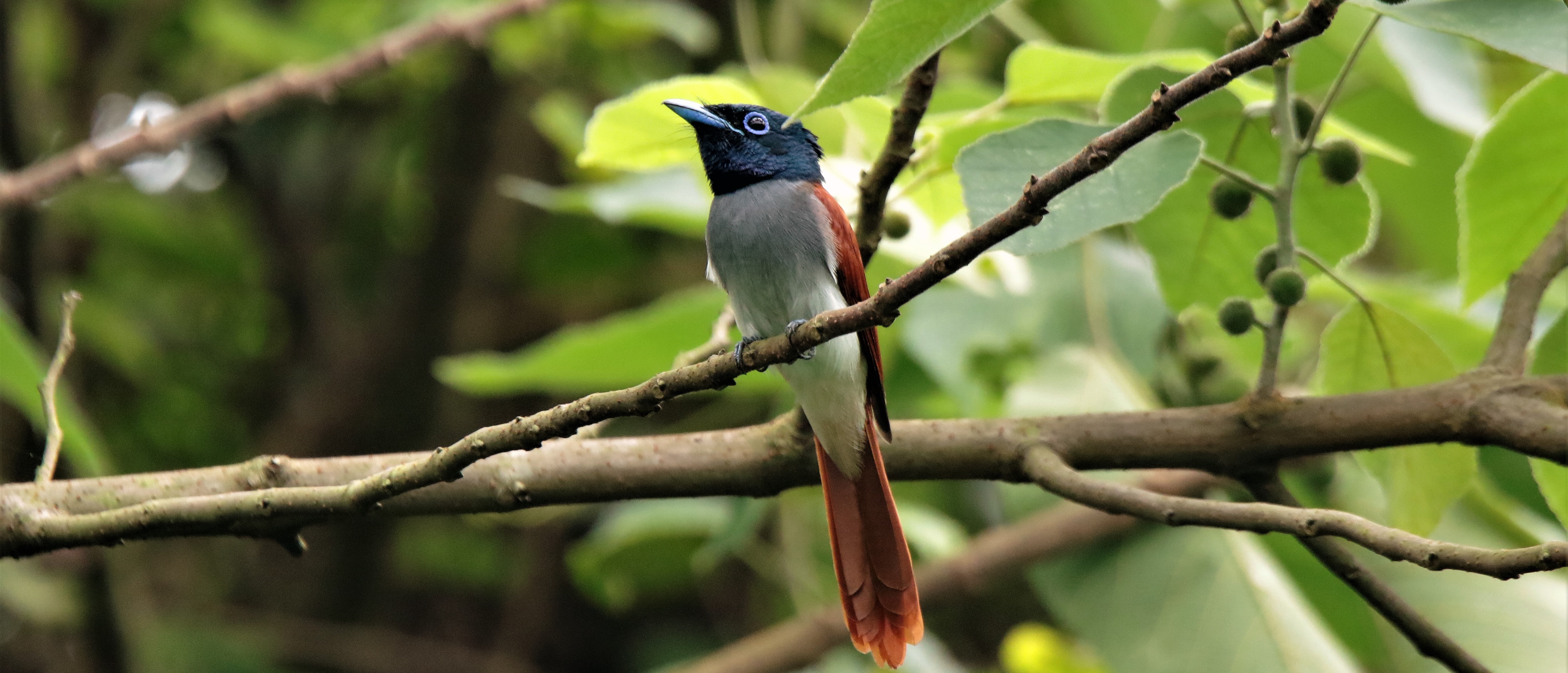
female

Ten subspecies are recognized:

- T. a. saturatior - (Salomonsen, 1933): Breeds in the eastern parts of Nepal and northeastern India, in eastern Bangladesh and northern Myanmar; populations occurring in Malaysia migrate northward for breeding.
- T. a. nicobarica - Oates, 1890: Originally described as a separate species. Found on Nicobar Islands
- T. a. burmae - (Salomonsen, 1933): Found in central Myanmar
- T. a. indochinensis - (Salomonsen, 1933): Found in eastern Myanmar and southern China to Indochina
- T. a. affinis - (Blyth, 1846): Found on Malay Peninsula and Sumatra
- T. a. procera - (Richmond, 1903): Originally described as a separate species. Found on Simeulue (off north-western Sumatra)
- T. a. insularis - Salvadori, 1887: Originally described as a separate species. Found on Nias (off north-western Sumatra)
- T. a. borneensis - (Hartert, 1916): Found on Borneo
- T. a. sumbaensis - Meyer, AB, 1894: Originally described as a separate species. Found on Sumba (southern Lesser Sundas)

The Tenggara paradise flycatcher (T. floris), which is found on Sumbawa, Alor, Lembata and Flores (central Lesser Sundas), was formerly considered a subspecies, but has recently been reclassified as a distinct species.

== Description ==
Blyth's paradise flycatcher is a typical paradise flycatcher, with a striking plumage. It is characterized by a dimorphic male, exhibiting both rufous and white plumage variations. Both morphs share a dark head, a small, triangular crest, and a blue eye-ring. The breeding male is distinguished by elongated central tail streamers, nearly twice the length of its body. Females bear resemblance to non-breeding rufous males, but usually show a less vibrant blue eye-ring and a slightly paler head. White morphs display dark wing and central tail feather shaft streaks.

Identification can be challenging due to similarities with the Amur paradise flycatcher, Indian paradise flycatcher, and female black paradise flycatcher where their ranges overlap. Distinguishing features include the short, rounded crest of Blyth's paradise flycatcher (contrasting with the longer, pointed crest of the Indian paradise flycatcher), a pale rufous undertail in rufous morphs (versus the white undertail of the Amur paradise flycatcher and black undertail of the black paradise flycatcher), and a gradual transition to grey on the underparts of rufous morphs, lacking the sharp contrast observed in other species.

The song is a ringing series of "wiwiwiwiwiwiwi" notes, while the call is a nasal "ji-jeh" or "ji-jeh-jeh".
