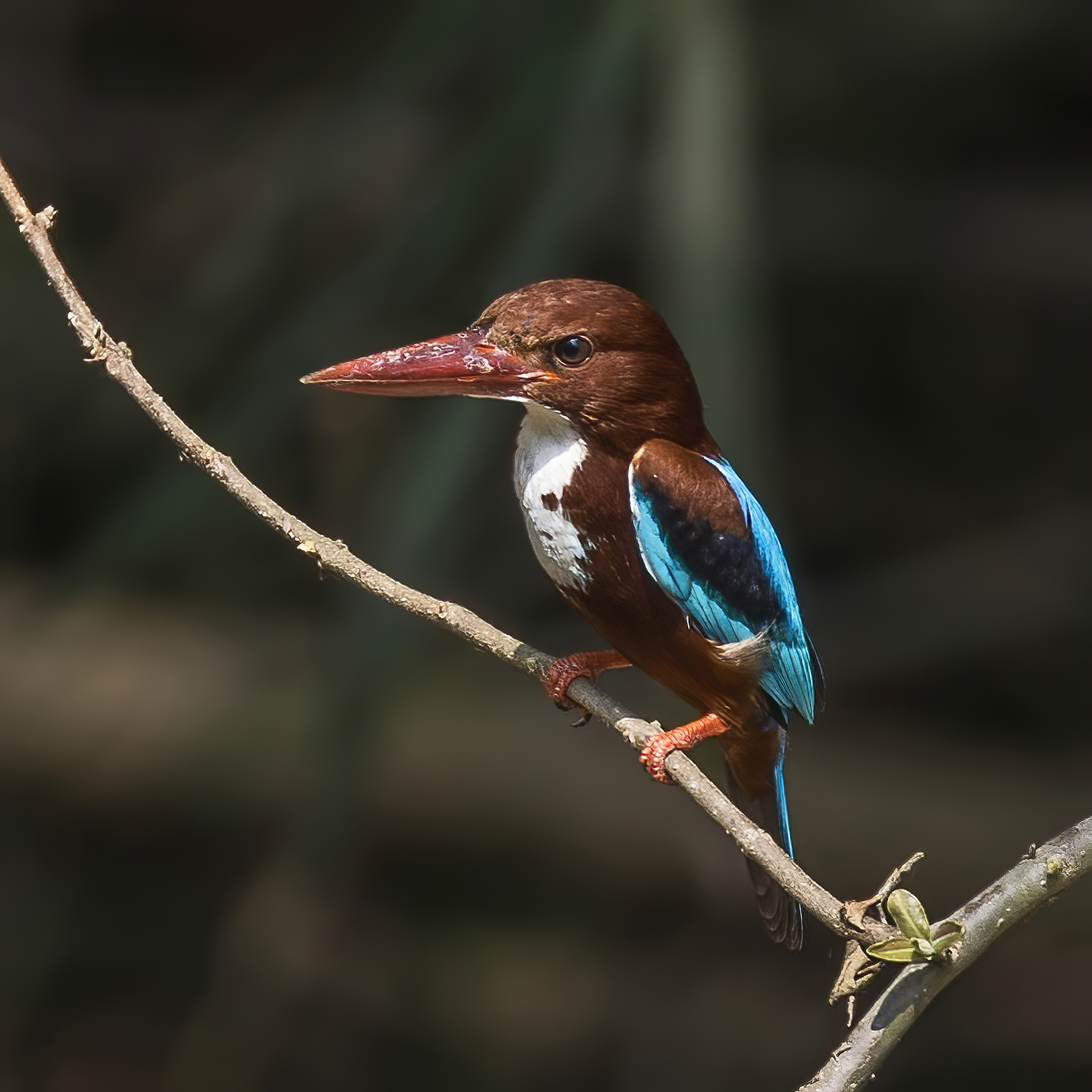
- H. s. fusca (Sri Lanka)

Conservation status
- Least Concern (IUCN 3.1)

Scientific classification
- Kingdom: Animalia
- Phylum: Chordata
- Class: Aves
- Order: Coraciiformes
- Family: Alcedinidae
- Subfamily: Halcyoninae
- Genus: Halcyon
- Species: H. smyrnensis

Binomial name
- Halcyon smyrnensis (Linnaeus, 1758)

Synonyms
- Alcedo smyrnensis Linnaeus, 1758

Audio
- Call

= White-throated kingfisher =

Species of bird from Asia

The white-throated kingfisher (Halcyon smyrnensis) also known as the white-breasted kingfisher is a tree kingfisher, widely distributed in Asia from the Sinai east through the Indian subcontinent to China and Indonesia. This kingfisher is a resident over much of its range, although some populations may make short distance movements. It can often be found well away from water where it feeds on a wide range of prey that includes small reptiles, amphibians, crabs, small rodents and even birds. During the breeding season they call loudly in the mornings from prominent perches including the tops of buildings in urban areas or on wires.

== Taxonomy ==
The white-throated kingfisher is one of the many birds that were first formally described by the Swedish naturalist Carl Linnaeus in 1758 in the tenth edition of his Systema Naturae. He coined the binomial name Alcedo smyrnensis. Linnaeus cited Eleazar Albin's Natural History of Birds published in 1738 that included a description and a plate of the "Smirna Kingfisher". Albin's specimen was preserved in alcohol and had been collected by the botanist William Sherard who served as the British Consul at Smyrna between 1703 and 1716. The present genus Halcyon was introduced by the English naturalist and artist William Swainson in 1821. Halcyon is a name for a bird in Greek mythology generally associated with the kingfisher. The specific epithet smyrnensis is an adjective for the city of Smyrna (now İzmir in Turkey).

Five subspecies are recognised:

- H. s. smyrnensis (Linnaeus, 1758) – south Turkey to north east Egypt, Iraq to northwest India
- H. s. fusca (Boddaert, 1783) – west India and Sri Lanka
- H. s. perpulchra Madarász, 1904 – Bhutan to east India, Indochina, the Malay Peninsula and west Java
- H. s. saturatior Hume, 1874 – Andaman Islands
- H. s. fokiensis Laubmann & Götz, 1926 – south and east China, Taiwan and Hainan

The brown-breasted kingfisher (H. gularis) of the Philippines is usually now considered as a separate species. Support for this treatment was provided by a molecular study published in 2017 that found that H. s. gularis was more closely related to the Javan kingfisher (H. cyanoventris) than it was to the white-throated kingfisher. They were split as distinct species by the IUCN Red List and BirdLife International in 2014, and the International Ornithological Congress followed suit in 2022. The races H. s. perpulchra and H. s. fokiensis are sometimes included in H. s. fusca.

Local names include Baluchistan: aspi chidok; Sindhi: dalel; Hindi: kilkila, kourilla; Himachal Pradesh: neela machhrala; Punjabi: wadda machhera; Bengali: sandabuk machhranga; Assamese: māsorokā, মাছৰোকা; Cachar: dao natu gophu; Gujarati: kalkaliyo, safedchati kalkaliyo; Marathi: khundya; Tamil: vichuli; Telugu: lakmuka, buchegadu; Malayalam: ponman; Kannada: Minchulli(ಮಿಂಚುಳ್ಳಿ),rajamatsi; Sinhalese: pilihuduwa.

== Description ==
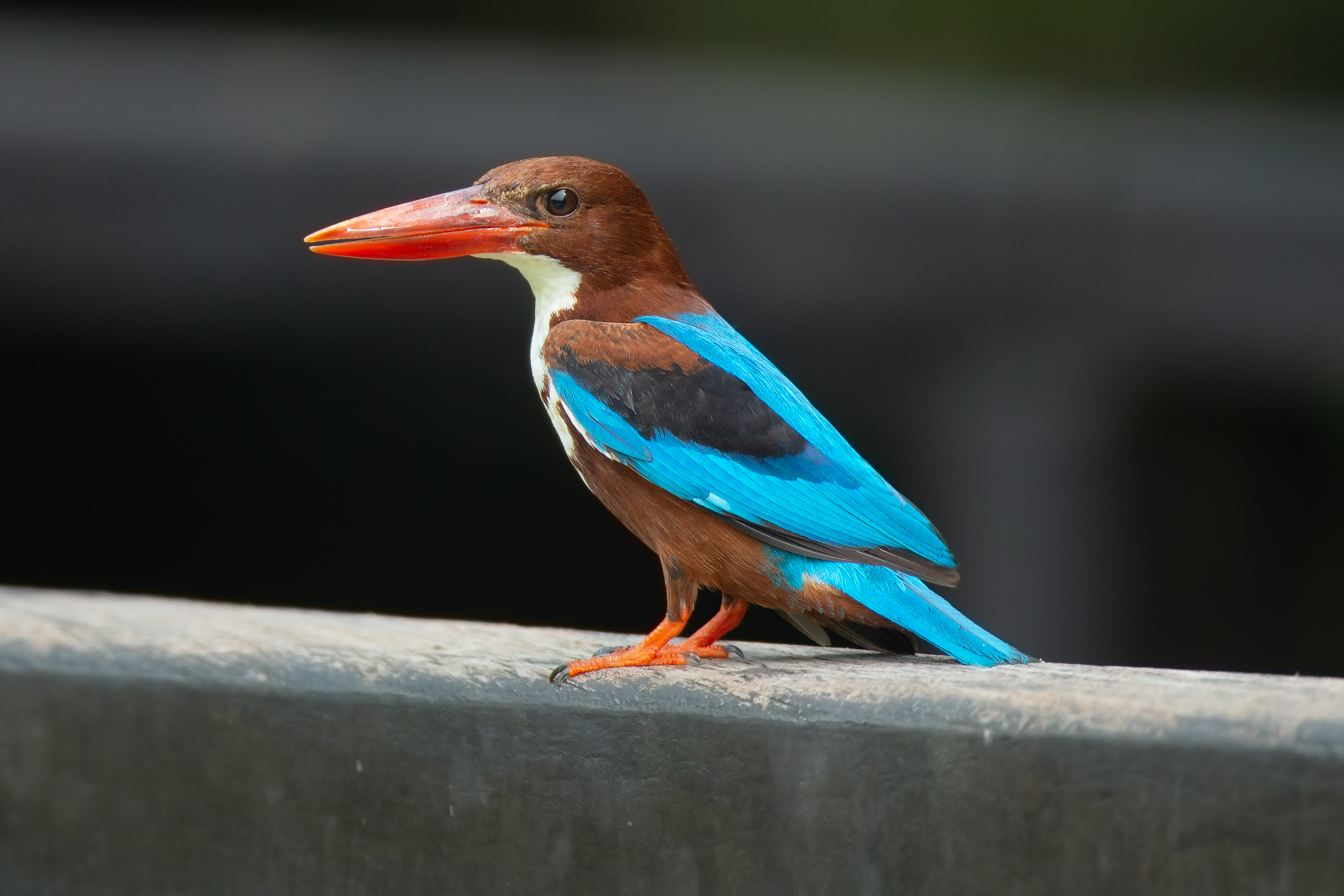
At Singapore Botanic Gardens

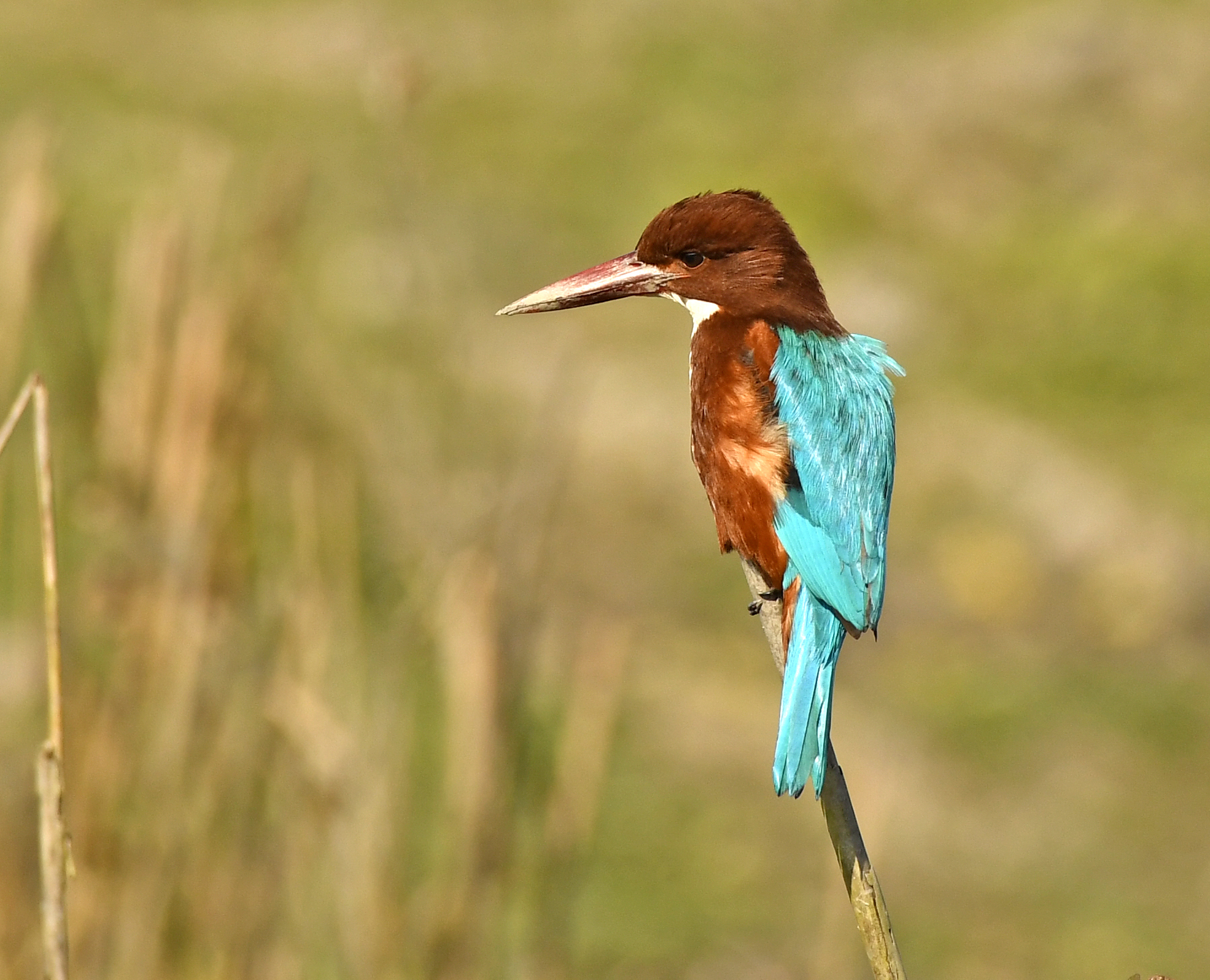
At Kaziranga National Park, Assam, India

This is a large kingfisher, 27–28 cm (10.6–11.0 in) in length. The adult has a bright blue back, wings and tail. Its head, shoulders, flanks and lower belly are chestnut, and the throat and breast are white. The large bill and legs are bright red. The flight of the white-throated kingfisher is rapid and direct, the short rounded wings whirring. In flight, large white patches are visible on the blue and black wings. Sexes are similar, but juveniles are a duller version of the adult.

This species forms a superspecies with Halcyon cyanoventris and most major works recognize four geographic races. They vary clinally in size, the shades of blue on the mantle which is more greenish in smyrnensis and fusca and more blue or purplish in saturatior. H. s. gularis of the Philippines has only the neck and throat white. It is sometimes treated as a distinct species, H. gularis. Race fusca is found in Peninsular India and Sri Lanka and is slightly smaller, bluer and with a darker brown underside than the nominate race found in northwestern India. Race saturatior is found in the Andaman Islands and is larger with darker brown underparts. Race perpulchra (not always recognized) is found in northeastern India and is smaller than fusca with paler underparts. Albinism has been noted on occasion.

== Distribution and habitat ==
The white-throated kingfisher is a common species in a variety of habitats, mostly open country in the plains (but has been seen at 7500 ft in the Himalayas) with trees, wires or other perches. The range of the species is expanding.

This kingfisher is widespread and populations are not threatened. Average density of 4.58 individuals per km^{2}. has been noted in the Sundarbans mangroves.

== Behaviour and ecology ==
=== Breeding ===
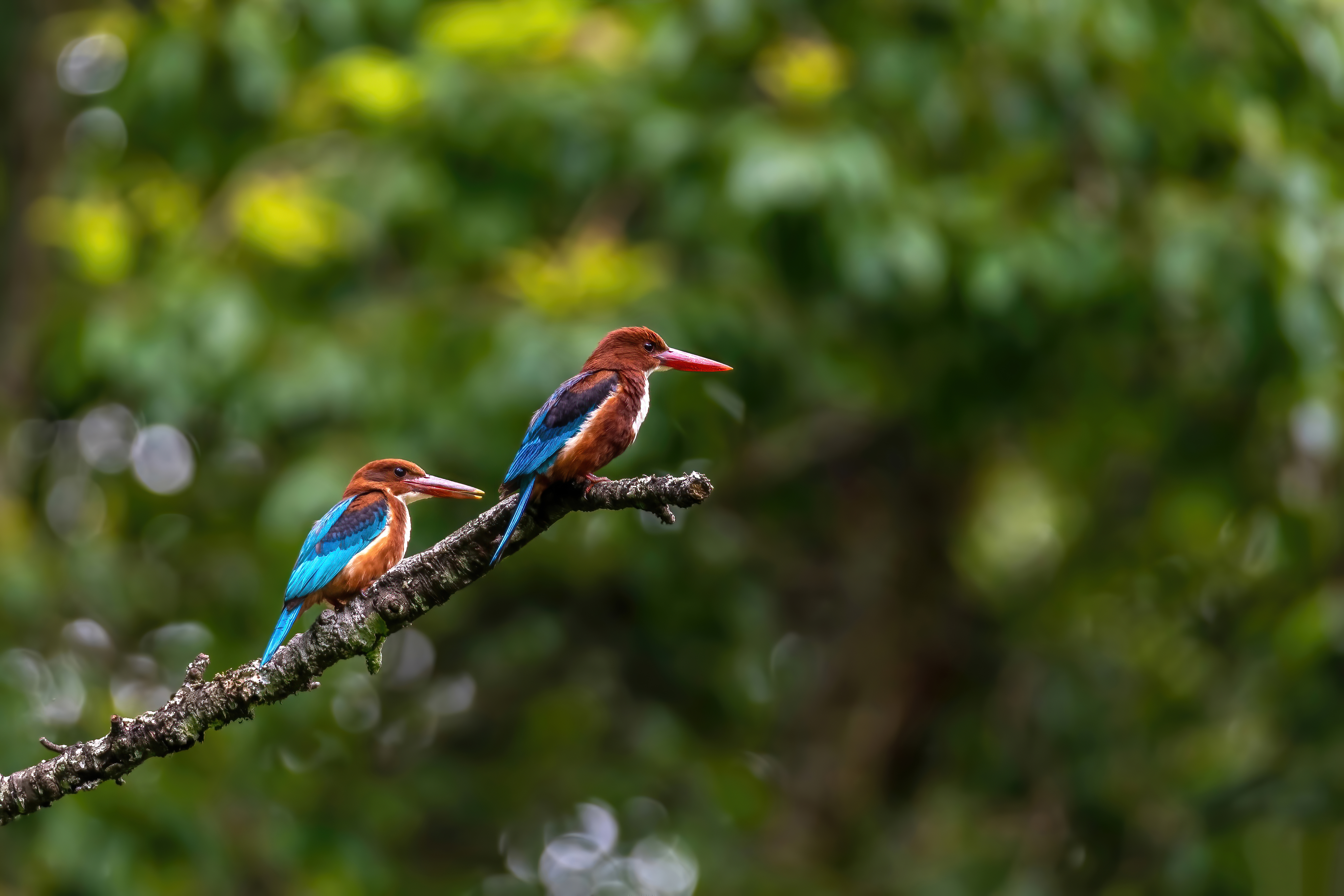
Couple of White-throated-Kingfisher

The white-throated kingfisher begins breeding at the onset of the Monsoons. Males perch on prominent high posts in their territory and call in the early morning. The tail may be flicked now and in its courtship display the wings are stiffly flicked open for a second or two exposing the white wing mirrors. They also raise their bill high and display the white throat and front. The female in invitation makes a rapid and prolonged kit-kit-kit... call. The nest is a tunnel (50 cm long, but a nest with a 3-foot tunnel has been noted) in an earth bank. The nest building begins with both birds flying into a suitable mud wall until an indentation is made where they can find a perch hold. They subsequently perch and continue digging the nest with their bills. Nest tunnels in a haystack have also been recorded. A single clutch of 4–7 round white eggs is typical. The eggs take 20–22 days to hatch while the chicks fledge in 19 days.

=== Feeding and diet ===
It perches conspicuously on wires or other exposed perches within its territory, and is a frequent sight in south Asia. This species mainly hunts large crustaceans, insects, earthworms, rodents, lizards, snakes, fish and frogs. Predation of small birds such as the Indian white-eye, chick of a red-wattled lapwing, sparrows and munias have been reported. The young are fed mostly on invertebrates. In captivity, it has been noted that it rarely drinks water although bathing regularly.

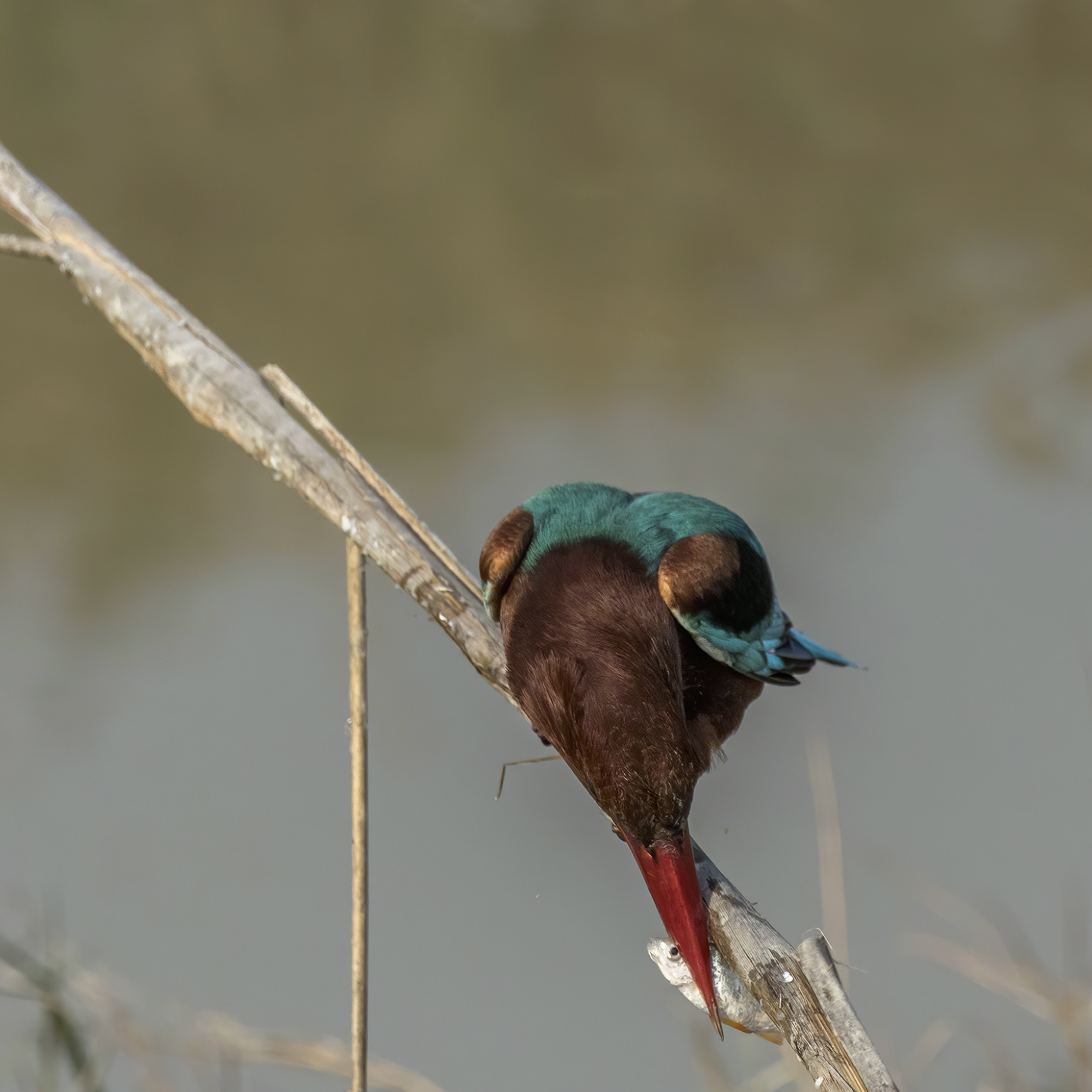
breaking the fish's spine

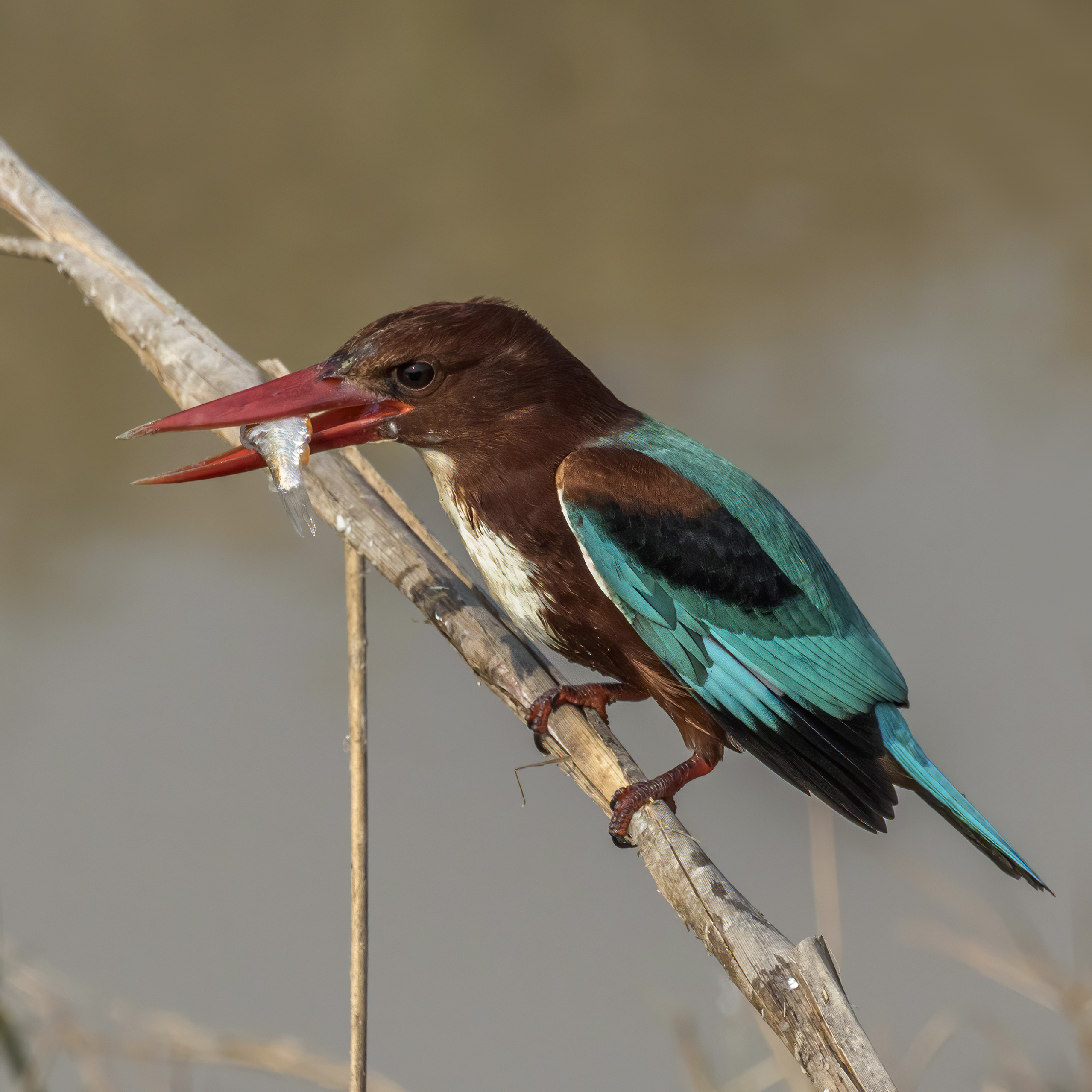
repositioned in beak

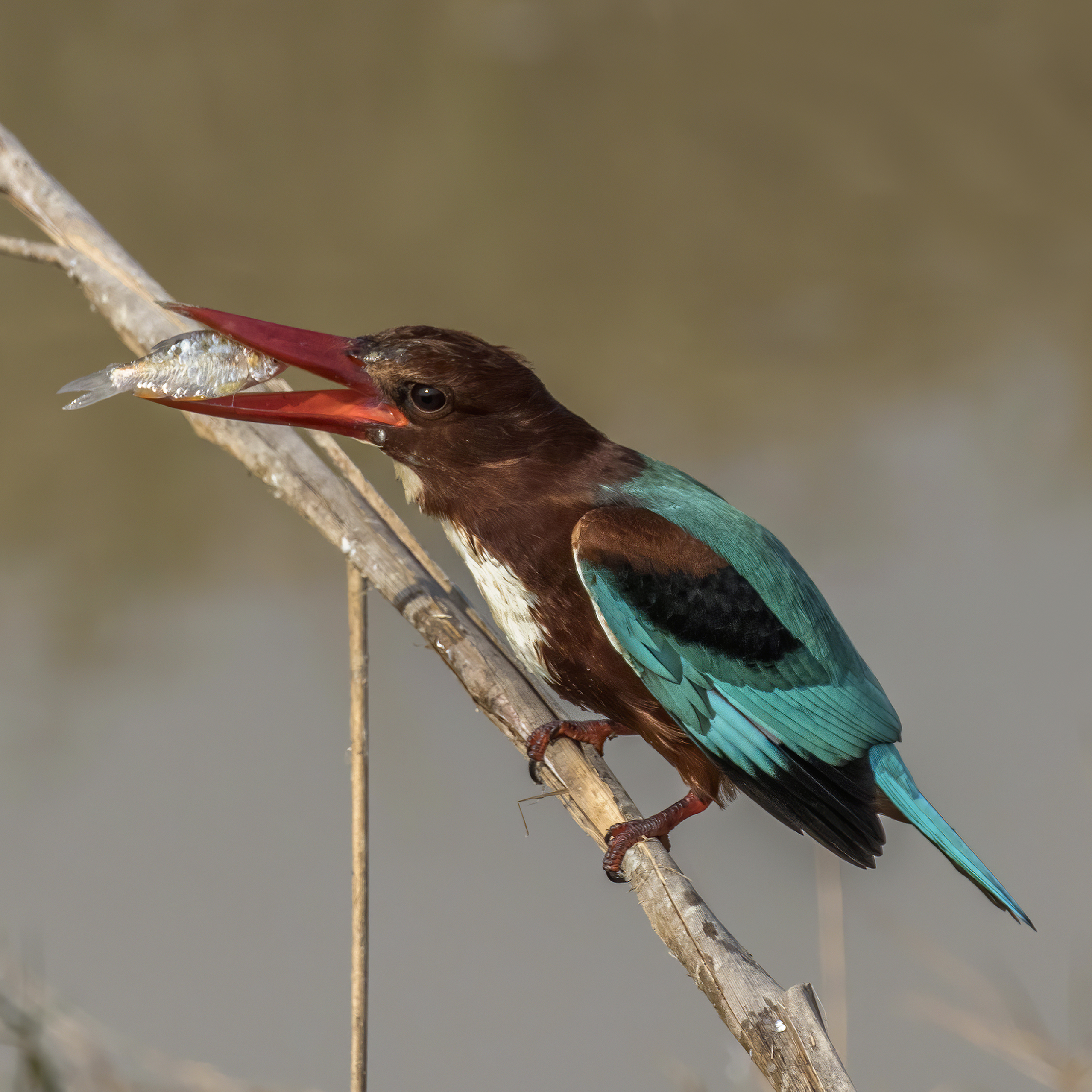
released and moved through 90 degrees.

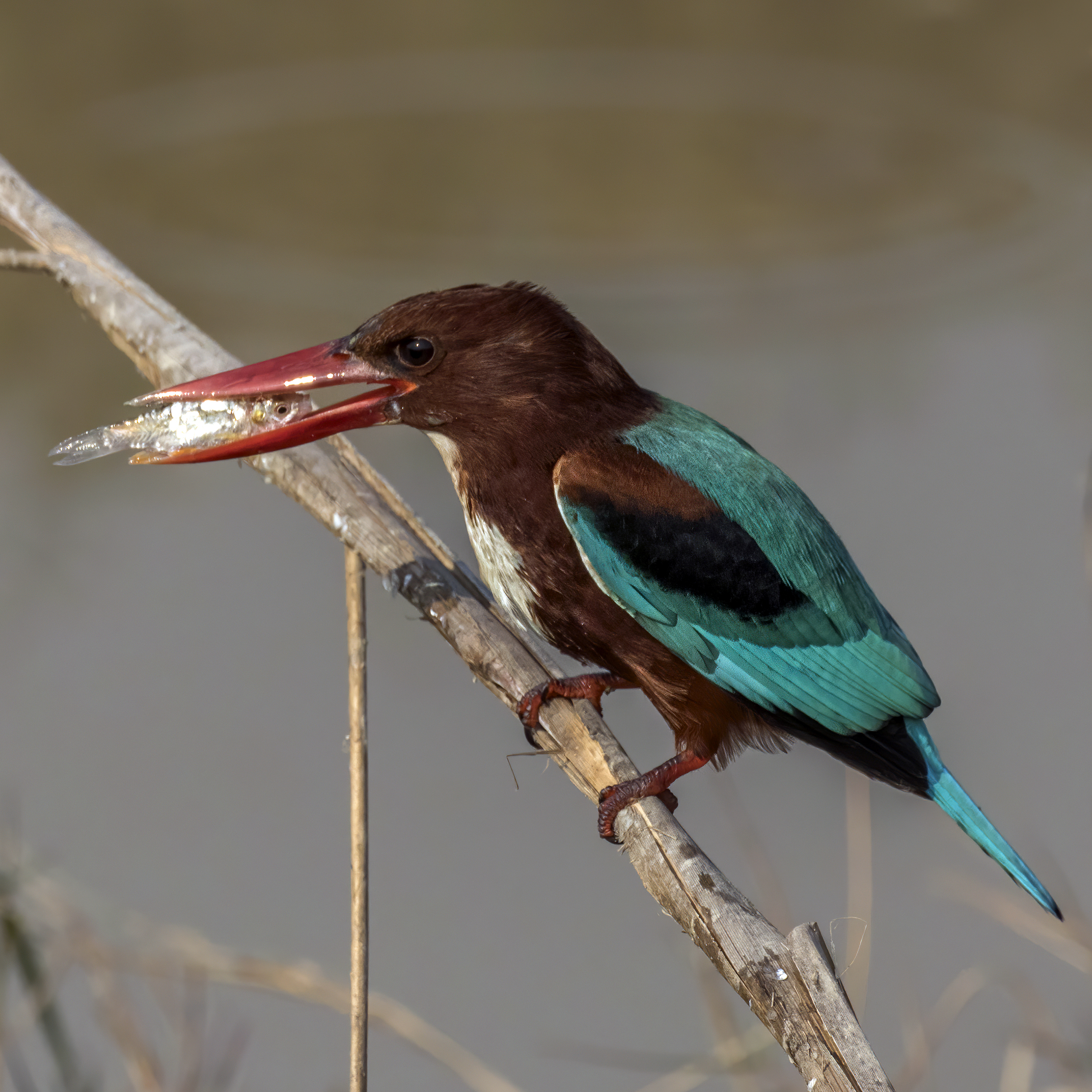
swallowing head first

=== Movements ===
Birds have sometimes been seen attracted to lights at night, especially during the monsoon season, suggesting that they are partly migratory.

=== Mortality ===
With a powerful bill and rapid flight, these kingfishers have few predators when healthy and rare cases of predation by a black kite and a jungle crow may be of sick or injured birds. An individual found dead with its beak embedded into the wood of a tree has been suggested as an accident during rapid pursuit of prey, possibly an Indian white-eye. A few parasites have been noted.

In the 1800s these birds were hunted for their bright feathers that were used to adorn hats.
