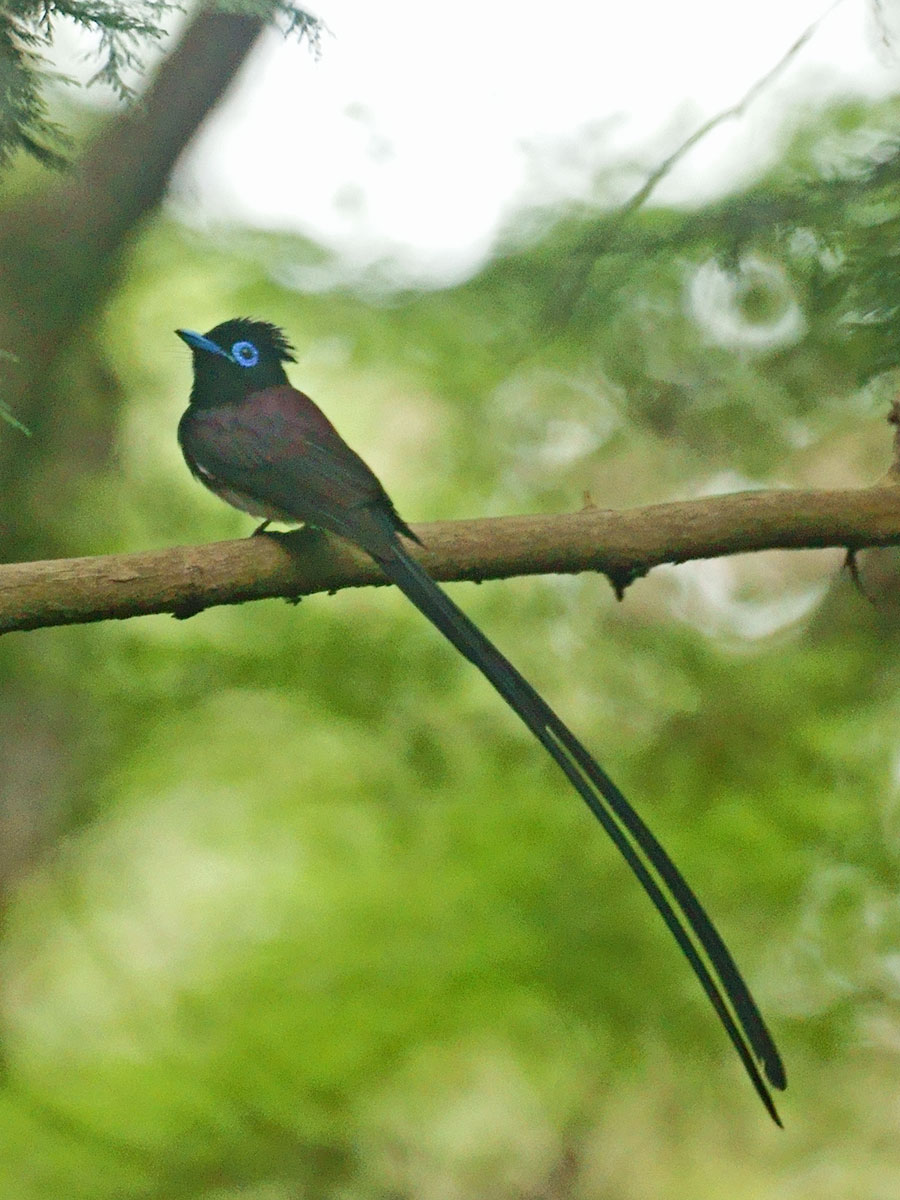
- Male in Kyoto

Conservation status
- Near Threatened (IUCN 3.1)

Scientific classification
- Kingdom: Animalia
- Phylum: Chordata
- Class: Aves
- Order: Passeriformes
- Family: Monarchidae
- Genus: Terpsiphone
- Species: T. atrocaudata

Binomial name
- Terpsiphone atrocaudata (Eyton, 1839)

Subspecies
- See text

Synonyms
- Muscipeta atrocaudata

= Black paradise flycatcher =

Species of bird

The black paradise flycatcher (Terpsiphone atrocaudata), also known as the Japanese paradise flycatcher, is a medium-sized passerine bird native to southeastern Asia. It is a glossy black, chestnut and white bird, slightly smaller than either the Amur paradise flycatcher or Blyth's paradise flycatcher, but similar in appearance. Males have exceptionally long tails. Females are generally duller in appearance and have shorter tails.

It is a migratory species, breeding in Japan, South Korea, Taiwan and the far north of the Philippines. Outside the breeding season it migrates to China, Thailand, Laos, Vietnam, other parts of the Philippines, Malaysia, Singapore, and Sumatra, Indonesia.

== Taxonomy and systematics ==
The black paradise flycatcher was previously classified with the Old World flycatcher family Muscicapidae, but the paradise-flycatchers, monarch flycatchers and Australasian fantails are now normally grouped with the drongos in the family Dicruridae, which has most of its members in Australasia and tropical southern Asia.

=== Subspecies ===
Three subspecies are recognized:

- T. a. atrocaudata - (Eyton, 1839): Breeds in central and southern Korea and Japan, wintering in Southeast Asia from Philippines to Sumatra. Seen as a spring and fall migrant through Southeast Asia including eastern China, Taiwan, Hong Kong, Vietnam, Laos, Singapore, Malaysia and Thailand.
- T. a. illex - Bangs, 1901: Originally described as a separate species. Smaller and darker than the nominate subspecies. Breeds on the Ryukyu Islands and is presumed to be resident.
- T. a. periophthalmica - (Ogilvie-Grant, 1895): Originally described as a separate species. Similar to illex but male has a purplish-back mantle and grey-black underparts with more restricted white on the belly. Found on Lanyu Island (off of southeast Taiwan) and Batan Island (northern Philippines)

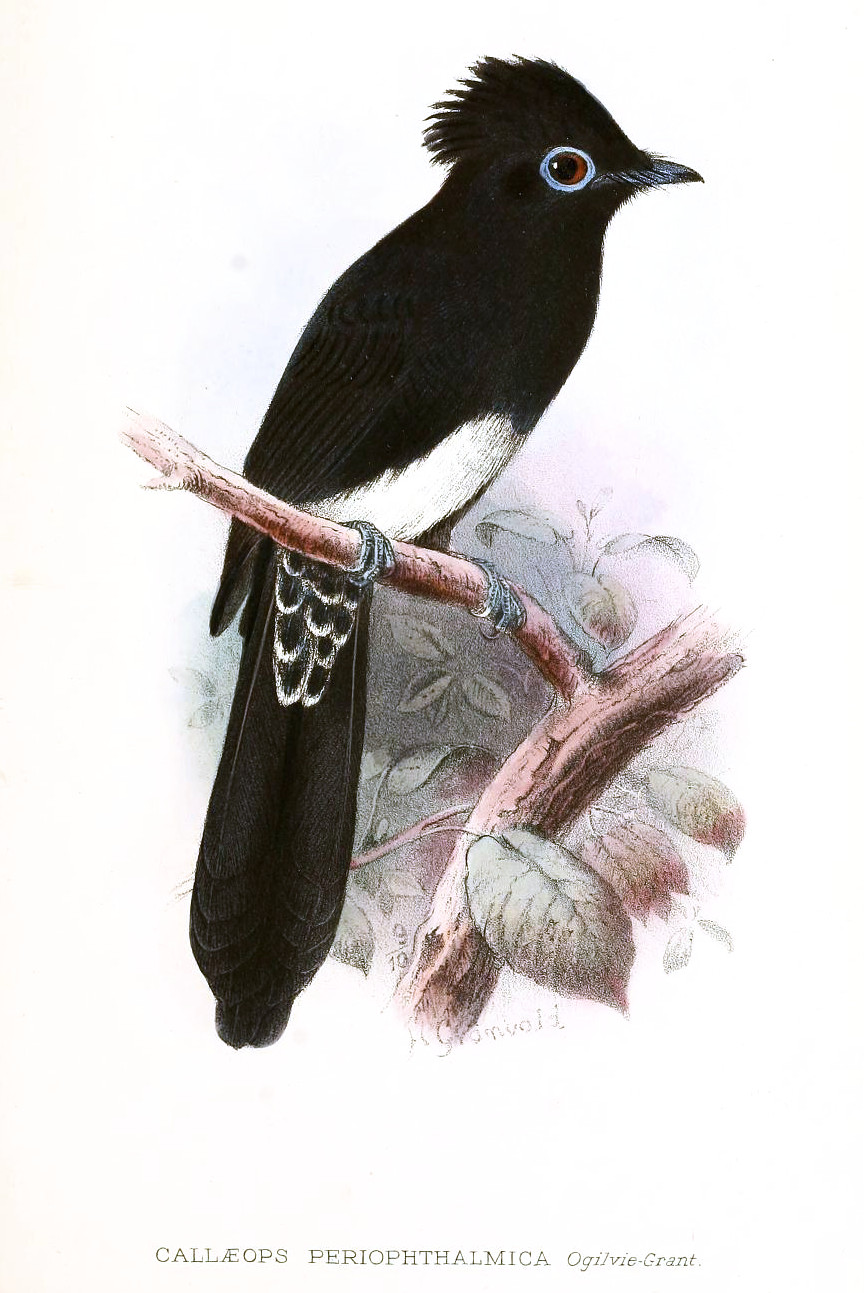
T. a. periophthalmica

== Description ==
The black paradise flycatcher is similar in appearance to both the Amur paradise flycatcher and Blyth's paradise flycatcher, but is slightly smaller. Mature males have a black hood with a purplish-blue gloss which shades into blackish-grey on the chest. The underparts are off-white to white. The mantle, back, wings and rump are plain dark chestnut. The tail has extremely long black central feathers, which are shorter in immature males. Unlike the Asian paradise flycatcher there is no white morph. The female resembles the male but is duller and darker brown on the chestnut areas. It has black legs and feet, a large black eye with a blue eye-ring, and a short blue bill.

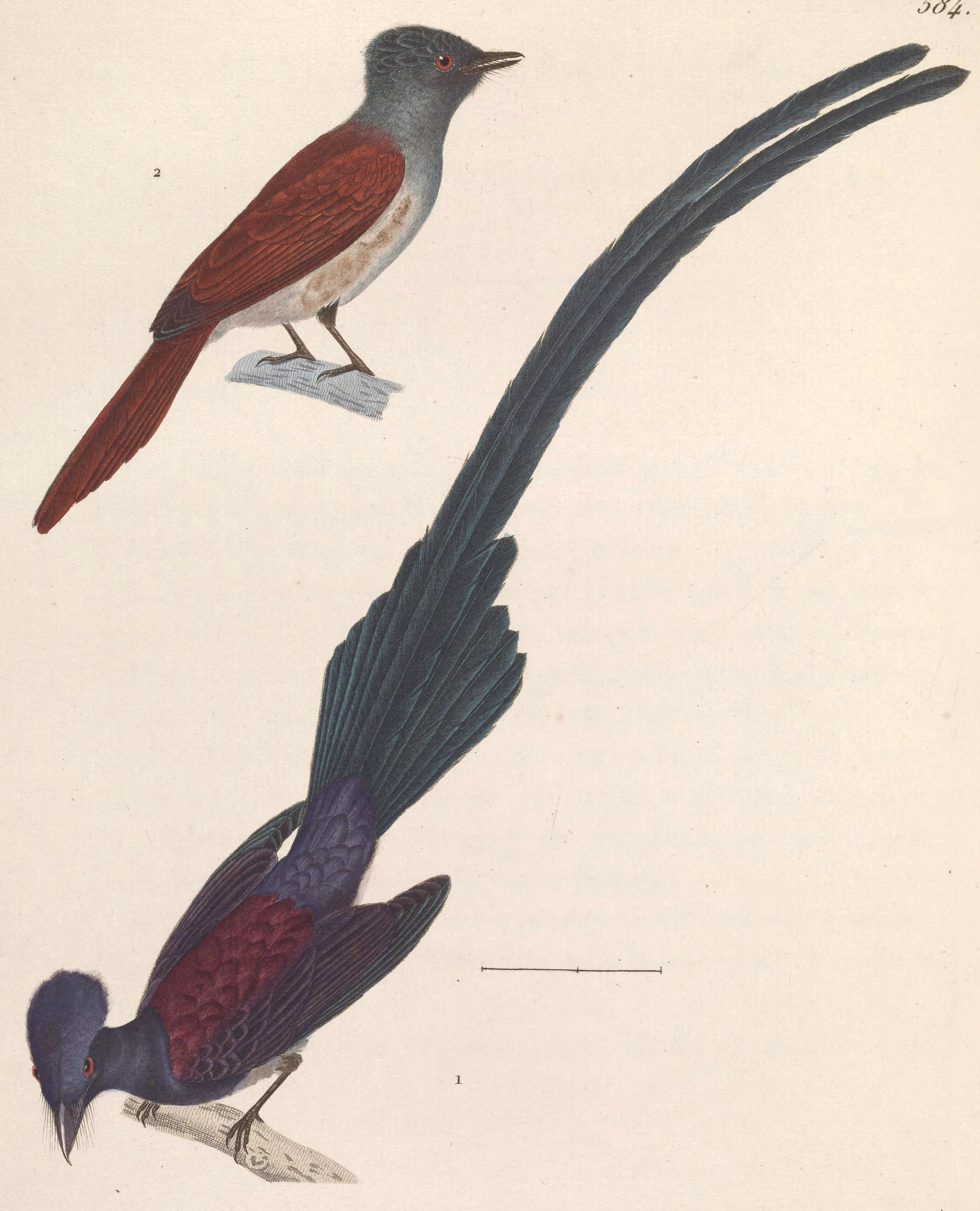
Depiction from 1838

The song is rendered in Japanese as tsuki-hi-hoshi, hoi-hoi-hoi, which translates to Moon-Sun-Stars and gives the Japanese name of the bird サンコウチョウ (三光鳥) sankōchō (literally, bird of three lights, i.e. moon, sun, star, from san three + kō lights + chō bird).

== Distribution and habitat ==
In Jeju-do of South Korea, Gotjawal Forest, a forest formed on a rocky area of volcanic AA Lava, is one of the important breeding sites of black paradise flycatcher.

A recent survey detected a steep decline in part of the Japanese breeding population which has presumably occurred because of forest loss and degradation in its winter range.
