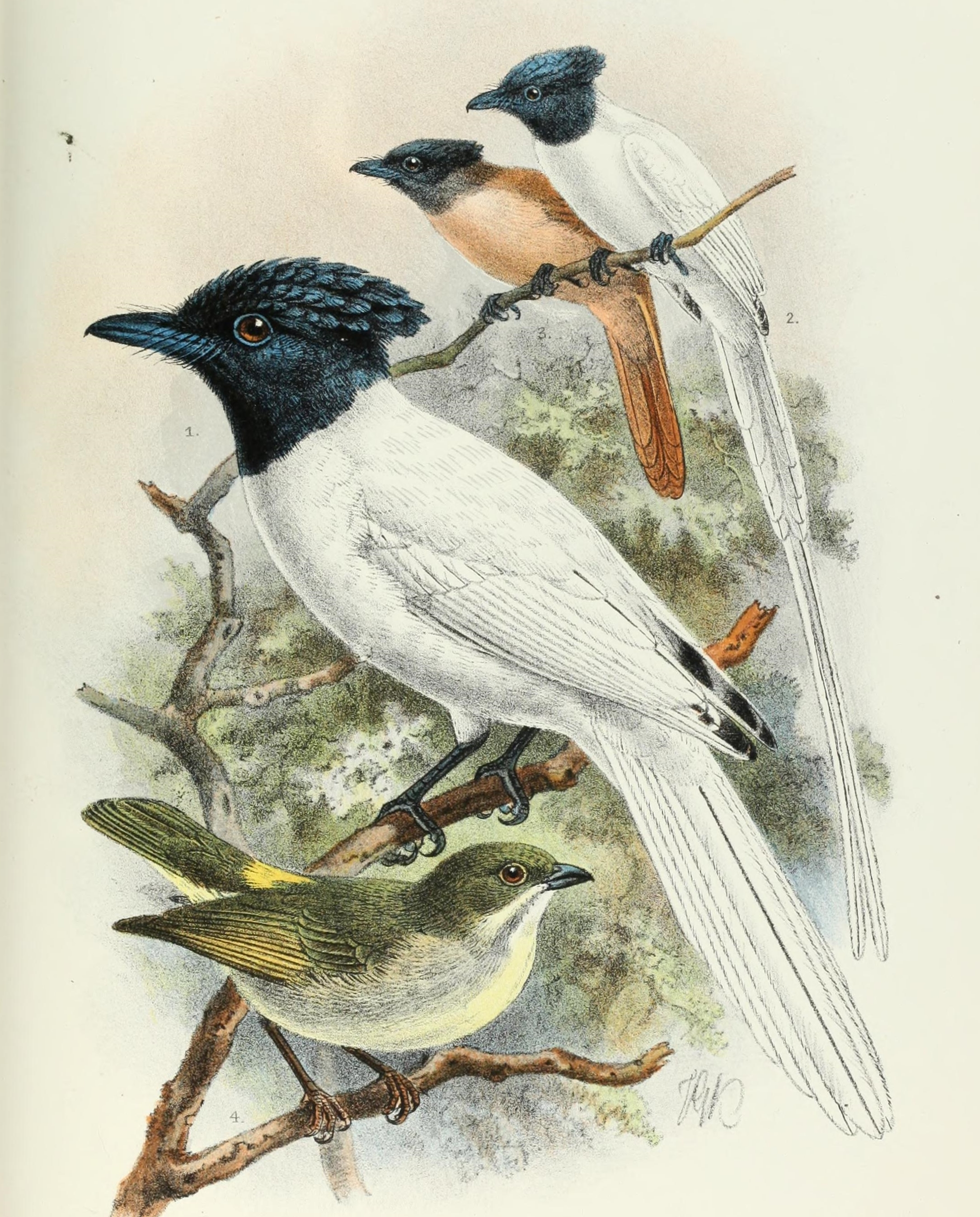
- With golden-rumped flowerpecker. Illustration by John Gerrard Keulemans.
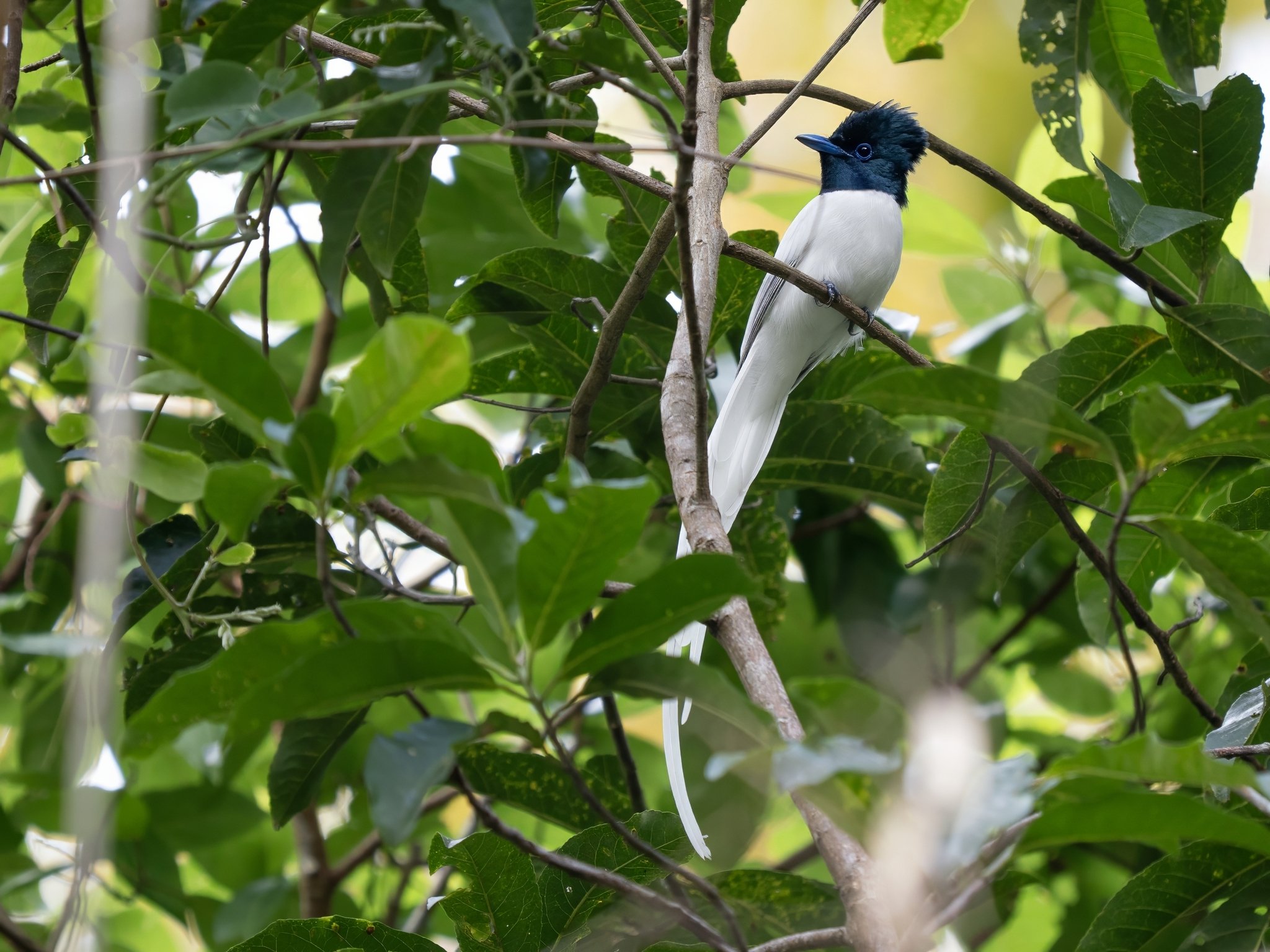
- In Sumba

Conservation status
- Least Concern (IUCN 3.1)

Scientific classification
- Kingdom: Animalia
- Phylum: Chordata
- Class: Aves
- Order: Passeriformes
- Family: Monarchidae
- Genus: Terpsiphone
- Species: T. floris

Binomial name
- Terpsiphone floris Büttikofer, 1894

Subspecies
- See text

= Tenggara paradise flycatcher =

Species of bird

Tenggara paradise flycatcher (Terpsiphone floris) is a species of bird in the family Monarchidae. It is native to Sumbawa, Alor, Lomblen and Flores islands in the Lesser Sundas. Formerly, it was considered a subspecies of the Blyth's paradise flycatcher until elevated to species rank by the IOC in 2021.
