= Asian paradise flycatcher =

In 2015, the Asian paradise flycatcher was split into the following three species:

- Indian paradise flycatcher (Terpsiphone paradisi)
- Blyth's paradise flycatcher (Terpsiphone affinis)
- Amur paradise flycatcher (Terpsiphone incei)
