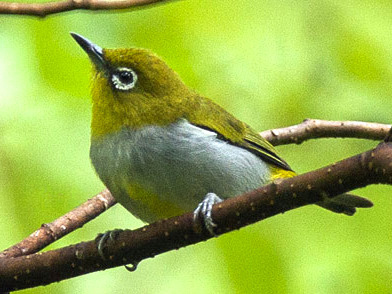

Conservation status
- Least Concern (IUCN 3.1)

Scientific classification
- Kingdom: Animalia
- Phylum: Chordata
- Class: Aves
- Order: Passeriformes
- Family: Zosteropidae
- Genus: Zosterops
- Species: Z. auriventer

Binomial name
- Zosterops auriventer Hume, 1878

= Hume's white-eye =

Species of bird

Hume's white-eye (Zosterops auriventer) is a bird species in the family Zosteropidae. It is found in upland areas of Myanmar, southern Thailand, the Malay Peninsula and Borneo.

This species was formerly treated as a subspecies of the Indian white-eye (Zosterops palpebrosus). Based on a study published as two articles in 2017, it was promoted to species rank. Included as subspecies are two taxa that were previously treated as subspecies of Everett's white-eye (Zosterops everetti).

There are four subspecies:

- Z. a. auriventer Hume, 1878 – southeast Myanmar (Tenasserim Hills)
- Z. a. tahanensis (Ogilvie-Grant, 1906) – central and south Malay Peninsula
- Z. a. wetmorei (Deignan, 1943) – south Thailand, north Malay Peninsula
- Z. a. medius Robinson & Kloss, 1923 – Borneo

It is omnivorous.
