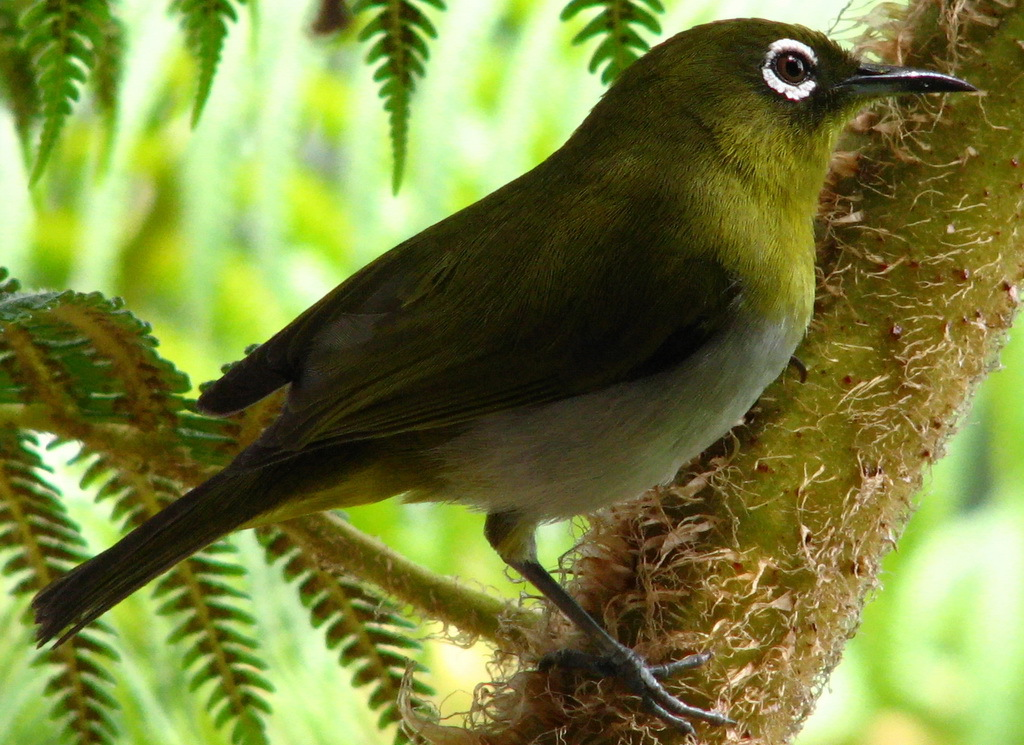

Conservation status
- Least Concern (IUCN 3.1)

Scientific classification
- Kingdom: Animalia
- Phylum: Chordata
- Class: Aves
- Order: Passeriformes
- Family: Zosteropidae
- Genus: Zosterops
- Species: Z. ceylonensis

Binomial name
- Zosterops ceylonensis Holdsworth, 1872

= Sri Lanka white-eye =

Sri Lankan white-eye

Species of bird

The Sri Lanka white-eye (Zosterops ceylonensis) is a small passerine bird in the white-eye family, which is endemic to Sri Lanka. It is a resident breeder in forests, gardens and plantations, mainly in the highlands.

== Taxonomy ==
A study showed that it is not sister to the other Sri Lankan species, the Indian White-eye (Zosterops palpebrosus), and it also suggested that it is the root species which gave rise to all white-eyes on Earth. This raises further questions on white-eye origins.

== Description ==
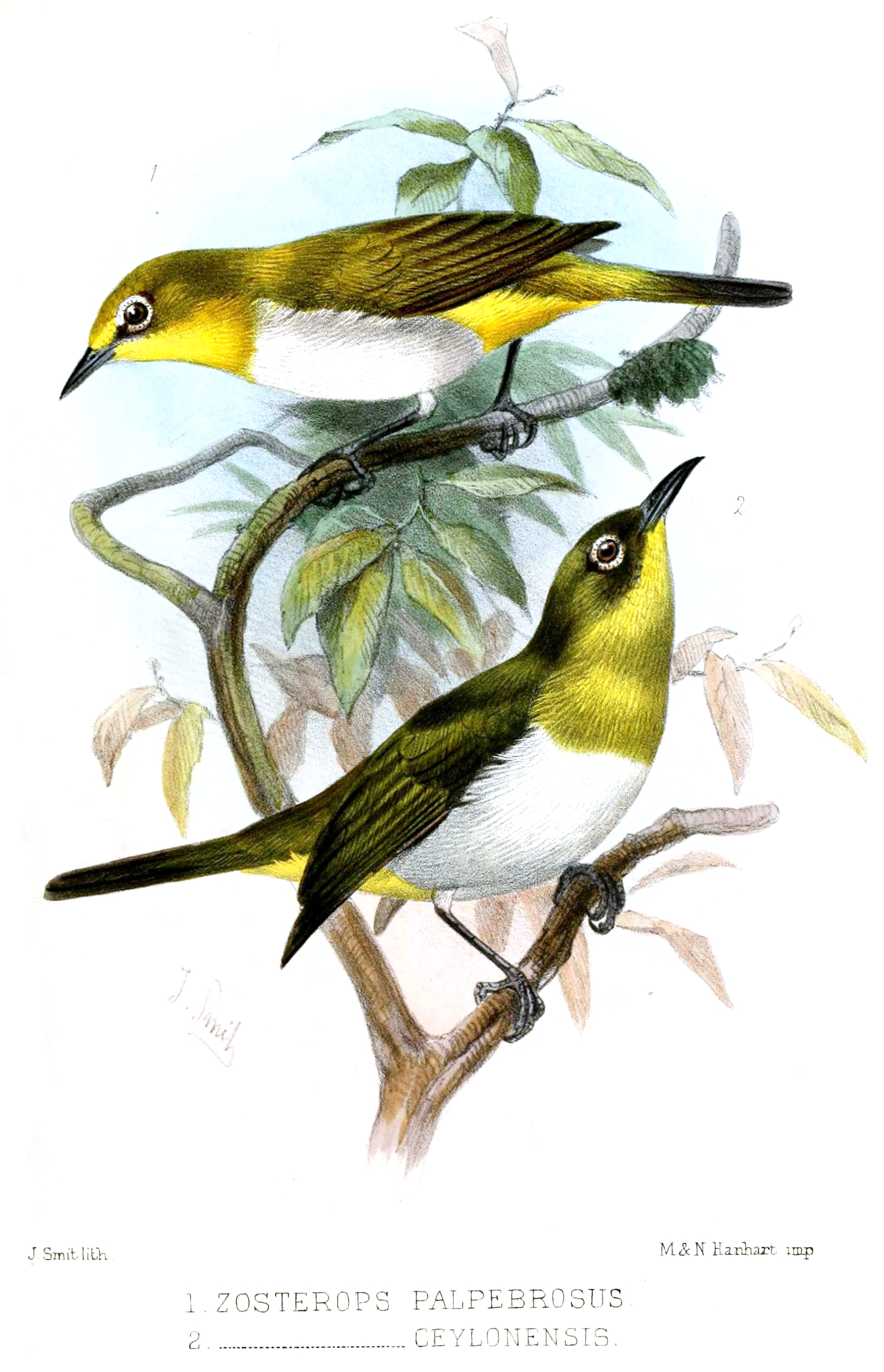
Comparison with Indian white-eye (above)

This bird is slightly larger than the Indian white-eye (about 11 cm long) which it replaces above 4000 ft. The upper parts of the body and sides of neck are dark olive-green. The rump appears paler green while the crown and forehead appear darker. The wings and tail are brown edged with green on the back. The typical ring of tiny white feathers around the eye is present. The lores are dark and there is a dark streak below the eye. The chin, throat and upper breast are greenish-yellow as are the thighs and vent. The belly region is greyish white. The dark bill has a slaty base to the lower mandible. The legs are dark. The iris is yellow to reddish-brown.

This species can be distinguished from the widespread Indian white-eye, Zosterops palpebrosus, by its larger size, duller green back and more extensive yellow on the breast. It has a darker patch between the eye and the bill.

It is sociable, forming large flocks which only disperse with the approach of the breeding season. It builds a tree nest and lays 3 unspotted pale blue eggs.

Though mainly insectivorous, the Sri Lankan white-eye will also eat nectar and fruits of various kinds.

The English and scientific names refer to the conspicuous ring of white feathers around the eyes, Zosterops being Greek for "girdle-eye".

== In culture ==
In Sri Lanka, this bird is known as Lanka Sithasiya in the Sinhala language. This bird appears on a 35c Sri Lankan postage stamp first issued in 1983.
