= Biological specificity =

Tendency of a characteristic to occur in a particular species

Biological specificity is the tendency of a characteristic such as a behavior or a biochemical variation to occur in a particular species. Biochemist Linus Pauling stated that "Biological specificity is the set of characteristics of living organisms or constituents of living organisms of being special or doing something special. Each animal or plant species is special. It differs in some way from all other species...biological specificity is the major problem about understanding life."

== Biological specificity within Homo sapiens ==
Homo sapiens has many characteristics that show the biological specificity in the form of behavior and morphological traits.

Morphologically, humans have an enlarged cranial capacity and more gracile features in comparison to other hominins. The reduction of dentition is a feature that allows for the advantage of adaptability in diet and survival. As a species, humans are culture dependent and much of human survival relies on the culture and social relationships. With the evolutionary change of the reduction of the pelvis and enlarged cranial capacity; events like childbirth are dependent on a safe, social setting to assist in the childbirth; a birthing mother will seek others when going into labor. This is a uniquely human experience, as other animals are able to give birth on their own and often choose to isolate themselves to do so to protect their young.

An example of a genetic adaptation unique to humans is the gene apolipoprotein E (APOE4) on chromosome 19. While chimpanzees may have the APOE gene, the study "The apolipoprotein E (APOE) gene appears functionally monomorphic in chimpanzees" shows that the diversity of the APOE gene in humans in unique. The polymorphism in APOE is only in humans as they carry alleles APOE2, APOE3, APOE4; APOE4, which allows humans to break down fatty protein and eat more protein than their ancestors, is also a genomic risk factor for Alzheimer's disease.

There are many behavioral characteristics that are specific to Homo sapiens in addition to childbirth. Specific and elaborate tool creation and use and language are other areas. Humans do not simply communicate; language is essential to their survival and complex culture. This culture must be learned, is variable and highly malleable to fit distinct social parameters. Humans do not simply communicate with a code or general understanding, but adhere to social standards, hierarchies, technologies, complex system of regulations and must maintain many dimensions of relationships in order to survive. This complexity of language and the dependence on culture is uniquely human.

Intraspecific behaviors and variations exist within Homo sapiens which adds to the complexity of culture and language. Intraspecific variations are differences in behavior or biology within a species. Variation in genetic expression of race and gender and complexities within society lead to social constructs such as roles. These add to power dynamics and hierarchies within the already multifaceted society.

== Subtopics ==
Characteristics may further be described as being interspecific, intraspecific, and conspecific.

=== Interspecific ===
Interspecificity (literally between/among species), or being interspecific, describes issues between organisms of separate species. These may include:

- Interspecies communication, communication between different species of animals, plants, fungi or bacteria
- Interspecific competition, when individuals of different species compete for the same resource in an ecosystem
- Interspecific feeding, when adults of one species feed the young of another species
- Interspecific hybridization, when two species within the same genus generate offspring. Offspring may develop into adults but may be sterile.
- Interspecific interaction, the effects organisms in a community have on one another
- Interspecific pregnancy, pregnancy involving an embryo or fetus belonging to another species than the carrier

=== Intraspecific ===
Intraspecificity (literally within species), or being intraspecific, describes behaviors, biochemical variations and other issues within members of a single species. These may include:

- Intraspecific antagonism, when members of the same species are hostile to one another
- Intraspecific competition, when members or groups from the same species compete for the same resource in an ecosystem
- Intraspecific hybridization, hybridization between sub-species within a species.
- Intraspecific mimicry

=== Conspecific ===
Two or more organisms, populations, or taxa are conspecific if they belong to the same species. Where different species can interbreed and their gametes compete, the conspecific gametes take precedence over heterospecific gametes. This is known as conspecific sperm precedence, or conspecific pollen precedence in plants.

=== Heterospecific ===
The antonym of conspecificity is the term heterospecificity: two organisms are heterospecific if they are considered to belong to different biological species.

== Related concepts ==
Congeners are organisms within the same genus.

== See also ==
- Evolutionary biology
