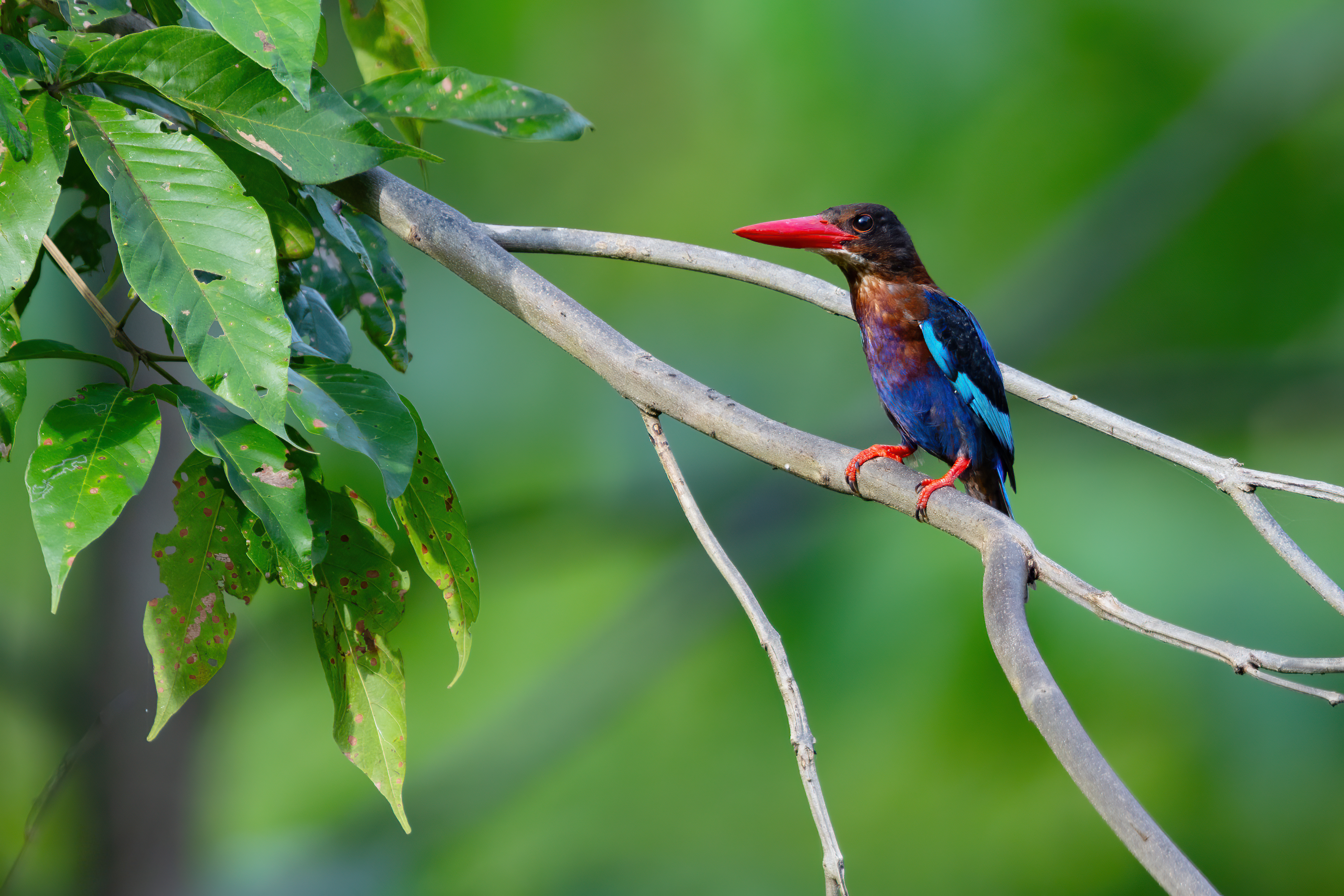

Conservation status
- Least Concern (IUCN 3.1)

Scientific classification
- Kingdom: Animalia
- Phylum: Chordata
- Class: Aves
- Order: Coraciiformes
- Family: Alcedinidae
- Subfamily: Halcyoninae
- Genus: Halcyon
- Species: H. cyanoventris

Binomial name
- Halcyon cyanoventris (Vieillot, 1818)

= Javan kingfisher =

Species of bird

The Javan kingfisher (Halcyon cyanoventris), sometimes called the blue-bellied kingfisher or Java kingfisher, is a medium-sized kingfisher (subfamily Halcyoninae) endemic to the Indonesian islands of Java and Bali.

The brightly-colored Javan kingfisher has the large head and bill typical of kingfishers, although the species is less suited for aquatic hunting than many of its relatives and catches much of its prey on land or near the water's edge. The highly territorial bird lays its round white eggs in burrows excavated from earthen walls and riverbanks.

== Taxonomy ==
The Javan kingfisher was first described in 1818 by the French ornithologist Louis Pierre Vieillot, who gave it the scientific name Alcedo cyanoventris. In 1821, William Swainson created the genus Halcyon for some of kingfishers — primarily those with stronger, thicker, more rounded beaks. The bird is today listed under the genus Halcyon, referring to the "Halcyon" bird of Greek legend, which contains 11 species of large, heavy-billed kingfishers. Halcyon kingfishers generally prefer woodlands and primarily consume small terrestrial animals rather than fish. H. cyanoventris forms a superspecies with the white-throated kingfisher Halcyon smyrnensis; although the birds are sometimes considered conspecific, they overlap in range in West Java without hybridizing.

Local names for the Javan kingfisher include "cekakak jawa", "cekakak gunung", or simply "cekakak" after their sharp, chattering vocalizations.

== Description ==
The Javan kingfisher is a medium-sized bird (25–27 cm at maturity) with a distinctive large red bill; dark brown irises, head, throat, and collar; a purple body; vivid turquoise primary coverts, secondaries, and tail; white wing patches on the bases of the primaries (visible in flight); and dark red feet. There are no reported significant sexual dimorphisms. Juveniles are duller with brownish-orange bills and whitish throats. Juveniles of the genus Halcyon often show light barring or mottling along areas that are more uniformly colored in adults.

The Javan kingfisher's call is described locally as cekakakak cekakakak cekakakak, hence its local name, Cekakak (or variants thereof). Others describe their call as a far-carrying scream that is striking and often heard, yet quieter than that of the collared kingfisher. Alternative published spellings of H. cyanoventris' call include tjie-rie-rie-rie-rie-rie, chee-ree-ree-ree, or cheree-cheree.

== Distribution and habitat ==
The Javan kingfisher is endemic to the Indonesian islands of Java and Bali. It is a non-migratory species that lives in a variety of habitats, including pastures, fish ponds, paddyfields, marshes, coastal scrub, mangroves, open dry forest, municipal parks and gardens, and orchards. They inhabit some coastal environments but generally avoid contact with seawater. Humid tropical forests with closed canopies are typically avoided, except where roads and development have cleared the open spaces kingfishers require to hunt. Urban and suburban spaces with suitable tree cover can also provide suitable habitat for Javan kingfishers. Unlike many species of kingfisher, the Javan kingfisher does not appear very dependent on proximity to a body of water. It is typically found at elevations below 1,500 m (4,900 ft) above sea level, but one study found Javan kingfishers at nearly 2,500 m (8,200 ft) on Mount Lawu in East-Central Java.

== Behaviour ==
Like all kingfishers, the Javan kingfisher is highly territorial and tends to stay close to its nesting area. They are mostly solitary animals, and are somewhat skittish around humans. Javan kingfishers are non-migratory.

=== Feeding ===
The Javan kingfisher displays classic kingfisher perch-and-wait behavior, preferring isolated perches or exposed branches at forest edges rather than closed-canopy forest interiors. As they display a limited degree of eye rotation, kingfishers use head movements to track their prey. Once a prey item is spotted, the kingfisher will wait for the opportune moment to swoop down and capture it with its large beak; after returning to a perch, the kingfisher will sometimes forcefully swing its prey against a branch in order to kill or soften it.

Like other Halcyon kingfishers, the Javan kingfisher typically prefers insects and small prey animals taken on land or at the water's edge over prey items actually within the water, and in fact seems less suited to aquatic hunting than many kingfishers of other genera. A typical diet can include fish, frogs, reptiles, freshwater shrimps, terrestrial and aquatic insects, and the larvae of Dytiscides water beetles. Their diet is most likely dependent on the prey resources available within their territories, which can include a wide variety of habitat types.

When rearing offspring, Javan kingfishers will adjust their prey preferences according to the age of their young—hatchlings will first receive soft food such as worms and grubs, then gradually progress to small fish, reptiles, and larger insects as they mature.

=== Breeding ===
The Javan kingfisher's nesting season lasts from March through September, though some sources say it begins as early as February. These breeding months roughly comprise Indonesia's dry season.

H. cyanoventris lays 3–5 eggs per clutch that are almost completely round (30.35 x 26.71 mm on average) and pure white. Like most kingfishers, they nest in a cavity at the end of a horizontal tunnel excavated into earthen walls or stream banks, often in open and sunny places. The tunnel openings are usually 1.5–3 meters above the ground, which probably helps defend against nest predation, and the tunnels are usually 40 cm to 1 meter in length.

Generation length is considered 3.8 years by the IUCN. Whereas most Alcedinidae are single-brooded, a single Javan kingfisher is able to lay eggs as many as four times per breeding season. Kingfisher chicks are altricial, hatching naked and blind, but grow quickly and typically fledge in less than one month.

Much about H. cyanoventris' breeding cycles and behavior is unknown due to the skittish nature of the birds and the difficulty of directly observing their nests.

=== Moulting ===
The halcyonine primary moult is descendant, starting with P1, the innermost primary feather.

== Status ==
The IUCN Red List currently considers the Javan kingfisher a species of "least concern," citing the bird's very large range and the fact that its population is not declining precipitously in its assessment of the species. However, the Javan kingfisher was considered "near threatened" as recently as 1988, and its population is generally considered to be declining. Population declines were noted as early as 1970 in Ujung Kulon National Park in West Java and local extinctions have also been reported in Bogor, although more recent literature has reported Javan kingfishers inhabiting planted urban spaces in Bogor. Even abundant populations in remote regions face danger from encroaching development, as Java has faced widespread deforestation and has few natural preservation areas.

The Javan Kingfisher was formerly protected by Indonesian Government Law No. 5 from 1990 and Government Law No. 7 from 1999. But despite its protected status, the bird is still frequently captured, caged, and sold in markets for the caged bird trade despite its unsuitability for captive raising. Nonetheless, in 2018 the Indonesian government removed protections for Javan kingfishers and several other bird species in light of the IUCN's "least concern" finding. The removal of the Javan kingfisher's protections have led to calls for a more thorough assessment of the species' population and status.

Additional threats include the use of pesticides in orchards and agricultural areas where the bird is frequently observed.

=== Priorities for future research ===
Comprehensive studies into the population size and trends of the Javan kingfisher are needed in order to properly assess their conservation status. Further research into the specific regions of population decline could also shed light on the processes threatening the species. More research is also required on the impacts of pesticides on Javan kingfishers and other birds adapted to urban and agricultural environments. Research into designing more bird-friendly urban spaces is also greatly needed as Indonesia continues to develop, as is research into the establishment of more protected areas for maintaining the health of Java's fauna.
