= Interspecific feeding =

Feeding between two separate animal species

Interspecific feeding refers to behaviour reported in wild animals, particularly birds where adults of one species feed the young of another species. This usually excludes the case of birds feeding brood parasites. The behaviour has been of theoretical interest since it appears to be provide little evolutionary benefit to the feeding bird. Some researchers have suggested that it is mainly male birds that are lured into feeding a fledgling that begs.

Such behaviour is also related to alloparenting, cross-fostering and brood adoption. Several situations have been suggested that lead to this including:

1. Bird raised in a mixed clutch
2. Original nest and brood of bird destroyed
3. Nests in very close proximity
4. Calling of young birds stimulates behaviour
5. Orphaned birds adopted temporarily or permanently
6. Male bird feeding another species while mate incubated
7. Feeding bird is mateless and finds a mateless bird at nest

Shy (1982) listed 65 species of birds involved in interspecific feeding. Riedman (1982) listed 150 species of birds that adopted young that did not belong to themselves.
