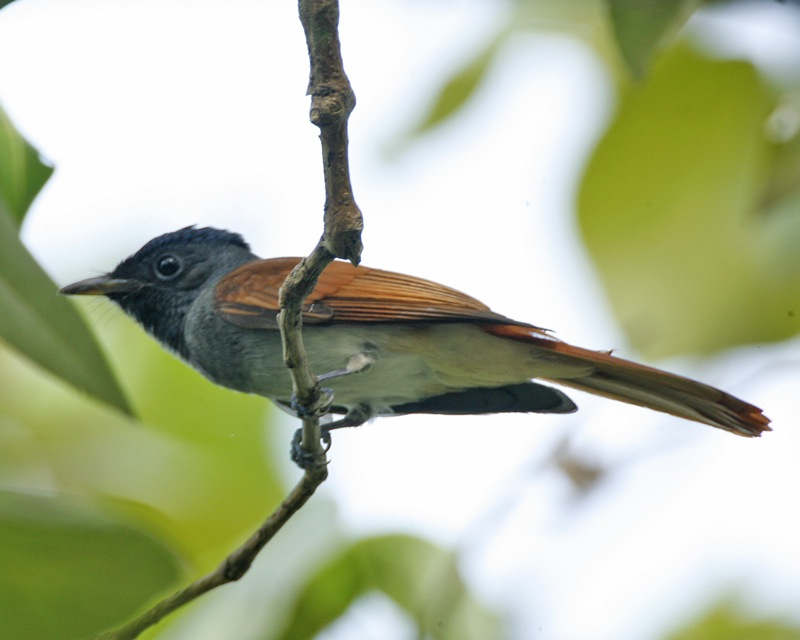

Conservation status
- Least Concern (IUCN 3.1)

Scientific classification
- Kingdom: Animalia
- Phylum: Chordata
- Class: Aves
- Order: Passeriformes
- Family: Monarchidae
- Genus: Terpsiphone
- Species: T. incei

Binomial name
- Terpsiphone incei (Gould, 1852)

Synonyms
- Muscipeta Incei (protonym); Terpsiphone paradisi incei

= Amur paradise flycatcher =

Species of bird

The Amur paradise flycatcher (Terpsiphone incei) is a bird species in the family Monarchidae. It is native to China and Primorsky Krai in the Russian Far East. It is a winter migrant to Southeast Asia. Until 2015, it was considered as a subspecies of the Asian paradise flycatcher.

== Description ==
Males can come in two forms differing in the colour of their upperparts. Otherwise, all adult males have black hoods, white underparts, small crests, and blue eye rings. While breeding, the males can have tails twice the length of the body.
