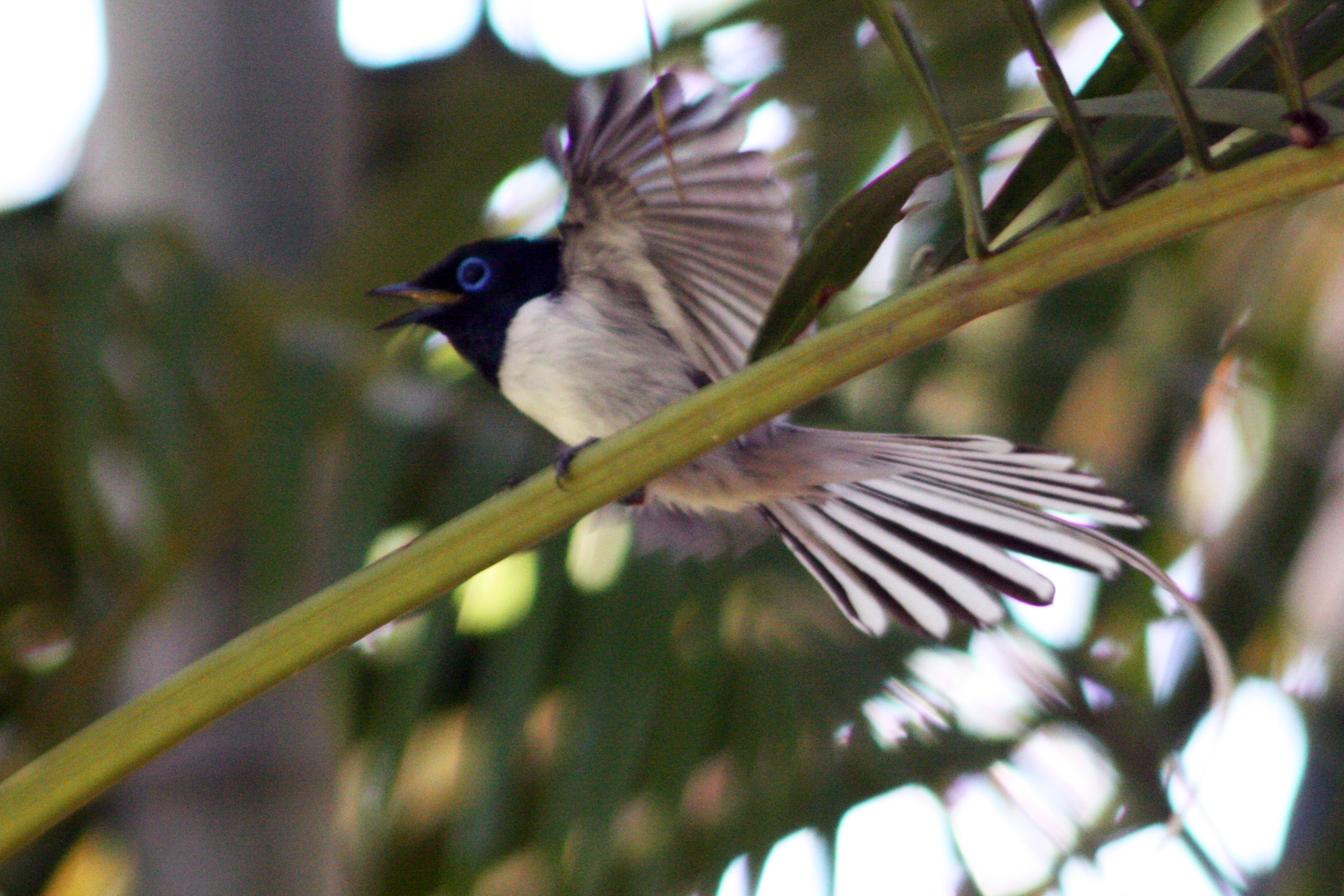
- Male white phase Terpsiphone mutata mutata

Conservation status
- Least Concern (IUCN 3.1)

Scientific classification
- Kingdom: Animalia
- Phylum: Chordata
- Class: Aves
- Order: Passeriformes
- Family: Monarchidae
- Genus: Terpsiphone
- Species: T. mutata

Binomial name
- Terpsiphone mutata (Linnaeus, 1766)

Subspecies
- See text

Synonyms
- Muscicapa mutata Linnaeus, 1766

= Malagasy paradise flycatcher =

Species of bird

The Malagasy paradise flycatcher (Terpsiphone mutata) is a species of bird in the family Monarchidae. It is found in Comoros, Madagascar, and Mayotte. Its natural habitats are subtropical or tropical dry forest and subtropical or tropical moist lowland forest.

== Taxonomy and systematics ==
In 1760 the French zoologist Mathurin Jacques Brisson included a description of the Malagasy paradise flycatcher in his Ornithologie based on a specimen collected in Madagascar. He used the French name Le gobe-mouche a longue queue de Madagascar and the Latin Muscicapa Madagascariensis Longicauda. Although Brisson coined Latin names, these do not conform to the binomial system and are not recognised by the International Commission on Zoological Nomenclature. When in 1766 the Swedish naturalist Carl Linnaeus updated his Systema Naturae for the twelfth edition, he added 240 species that had been previously described by Brisson. One of these was the Malagasy paradise flycatcher. Linnaeus included a brief description, coined the binomial name Muscicapa mutata and cited Brisson's work.

The species remained in the genus Muscicapa with other Old World flycatchers until 1827, when Constantin Wilhelm Lambert Gloger created the genus Terpsiphone for the paradise flycatchers. The genus name Terpsiphone comes from the Greek words terpsi, meaning "delighted in" (from terpo, "to delight") and phone, meaning "voice". The species name, mutata is Latin for "changed" or "different". An alternate common name is the Madagascar paradise flycatcher.

The Malagasy paradise flycatcher is thought to have evolved from African ancestors, as it appears to be more closely related to the African paradise flycatcher than the Indian paradise flycatcher.

=== Subspecies ===
There are five subspecies recognized, which differ only slightly in appearance:

- T. m. mutata - (Linnaeus, 1766): Found in Madagascar. Includes T. m. singetra
- T. m. pretiosa - (Lesson, 1847): Originally described as a separate species. Found on Mayotte in the eastern Comoros
- T. m. vulpina - (Edward Newton, 1877): Originally described as a separate species. Found on Anjouan in the central Comoros
- T. m. voeltzkowiana - (Stresemann, 1924): Found on Mohéli in the west-central Comoros
- T. m. comorensis (sometimes misspelled comoroensis) - (Milne-Edwards and Oustalet, 1885): Originally described as a separate species. Found on Grand Comore in the western Comoros

== Description ==
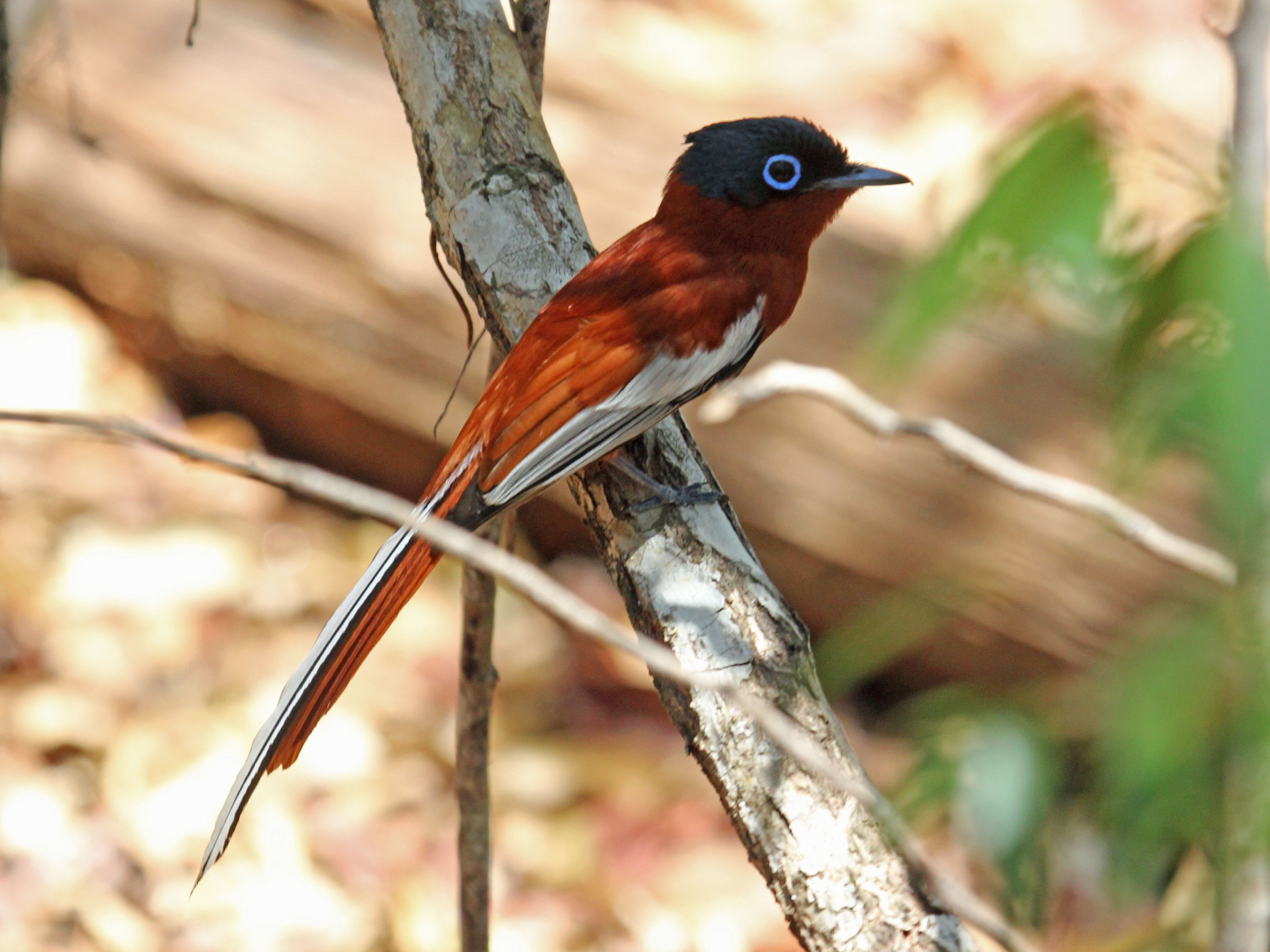
Female malagasy paradise flycatcher

The Malagasy paradise flycatcher is a medium-sized passerine, measuring 18 cm (7.1 in) in length and weighing between 12.1 and 12.3 g (0.43 and 0.43 oz). Males have long tail plumes, which can add as much as 18 cm (7.1 in) to their overall length. The female is largely rufous-orange, with a black head and nape. The flight feathers on her wings are black with rufous edges, and she has a thin, light blue eyelid wattle.

== Range and habitat ==
This species is a regional endemic found on Madagascar, Mayotte and the Comoros islands. It is common in all native forest types except montane forest, at elevations ranging from sea level to 1,600 m (5,200 ft). It also occurs, though less frequently, in other wooded habitats, including plantations, gardens and secondary forest.

== Behavior ==
=== Food and feeding ===
Like all members of its genus, the Malagasy paradise flycatcher is an insectivore, feeding on a variety of insects. It regularly joins mixed-species flocks, particularly those containing common newtonias. It is a "follower" in such flocks, allowing other birds to work as "beaters"; it follows them and hunts down any insect prey they flush. Studies have shown that the paradise flycatcher's foraging efficiency is directly correlated to the number of common newtonia in a flock; a greater number of common newtonias results in a higher foraging efficiency for any accompanying Malagasy paradise flycatchers. When rufous vangas, which generally forage within a meter (yard) or so of the ground, are present in the same mixed-species flocks as Malagasy paradise flycatchers, the latter preferentially follow the vangas, and therefore forage closer to the ground than they normally do.

=== Breeding ===
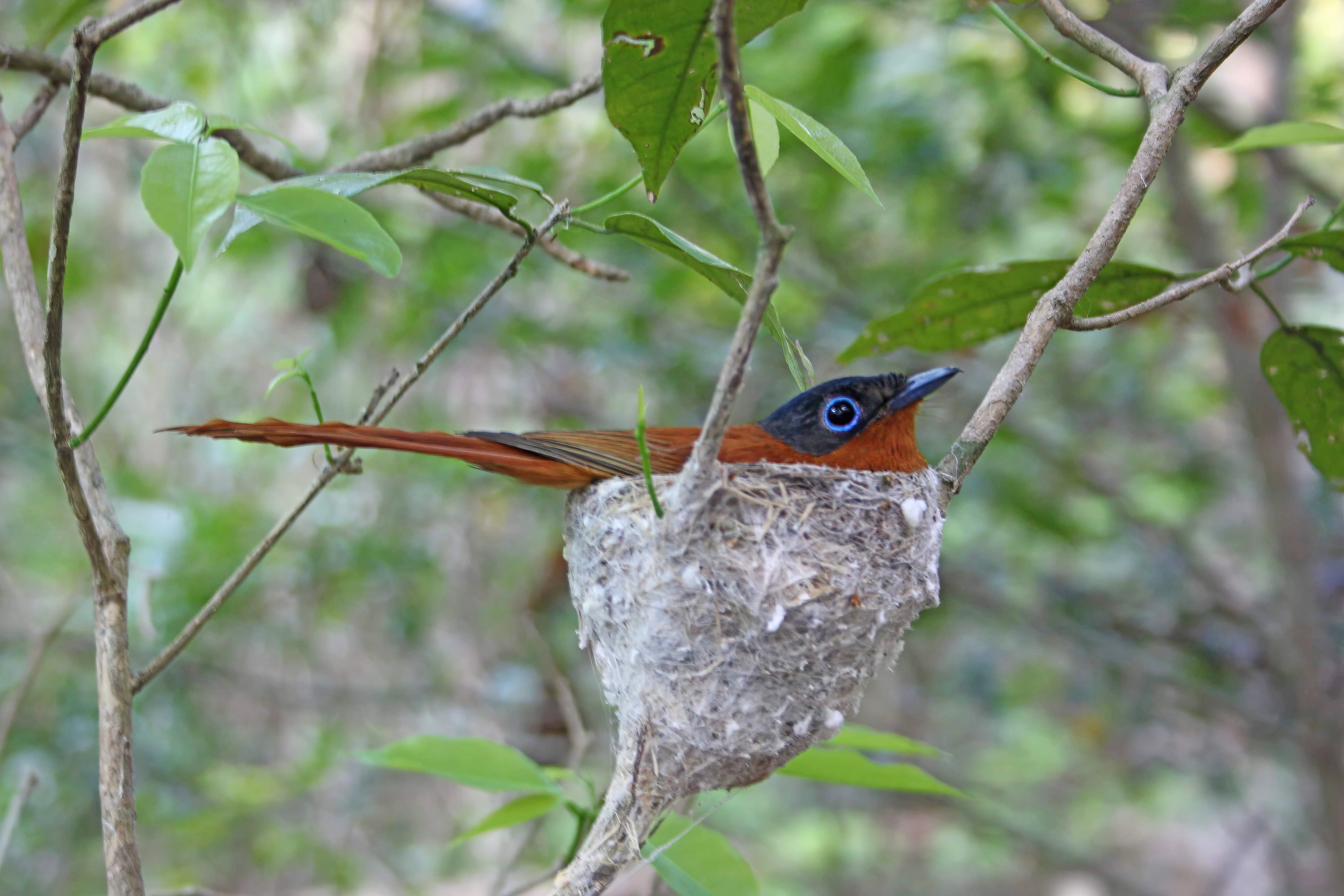
Female Terpsiphone mutata nesting. The small eye ring is not typical of the Madagascar sub-species and this may be one of the Comoro Islands sub-species.

The female typically lays a clutch of three eggs measuring 0.72–0.76 inches (18–19 mm) in length and 0.55–0.57 inches (14 mm) in width. These range in color from pinkish-white to salmon-pink, with dense brown or lavender speckling or blotching on the wide end of the egg. This species occasionally serves as host to the Madagascar cuckoo, a brood parasite.

== Conservation and threats ==
The IUCN rates the Malagasy paradise flycatcher as a species of Least Concern. Despite the fact that its numbers appear to be decreasing, the decline is not precipitous, the species is still common on Madagascar and its global range is sizable.

A number of diurnal raptors, including Frances's sparrowhawk, yellow-billed kite and Madagascar harrier-hawk hunt Malagasy paradise flycatchers. In addition, there is at least one record of a common brown lemur eating a nestling Malagasy paradise flycatcher, one of the few records of a wild lemur eating anything other than plant material.
