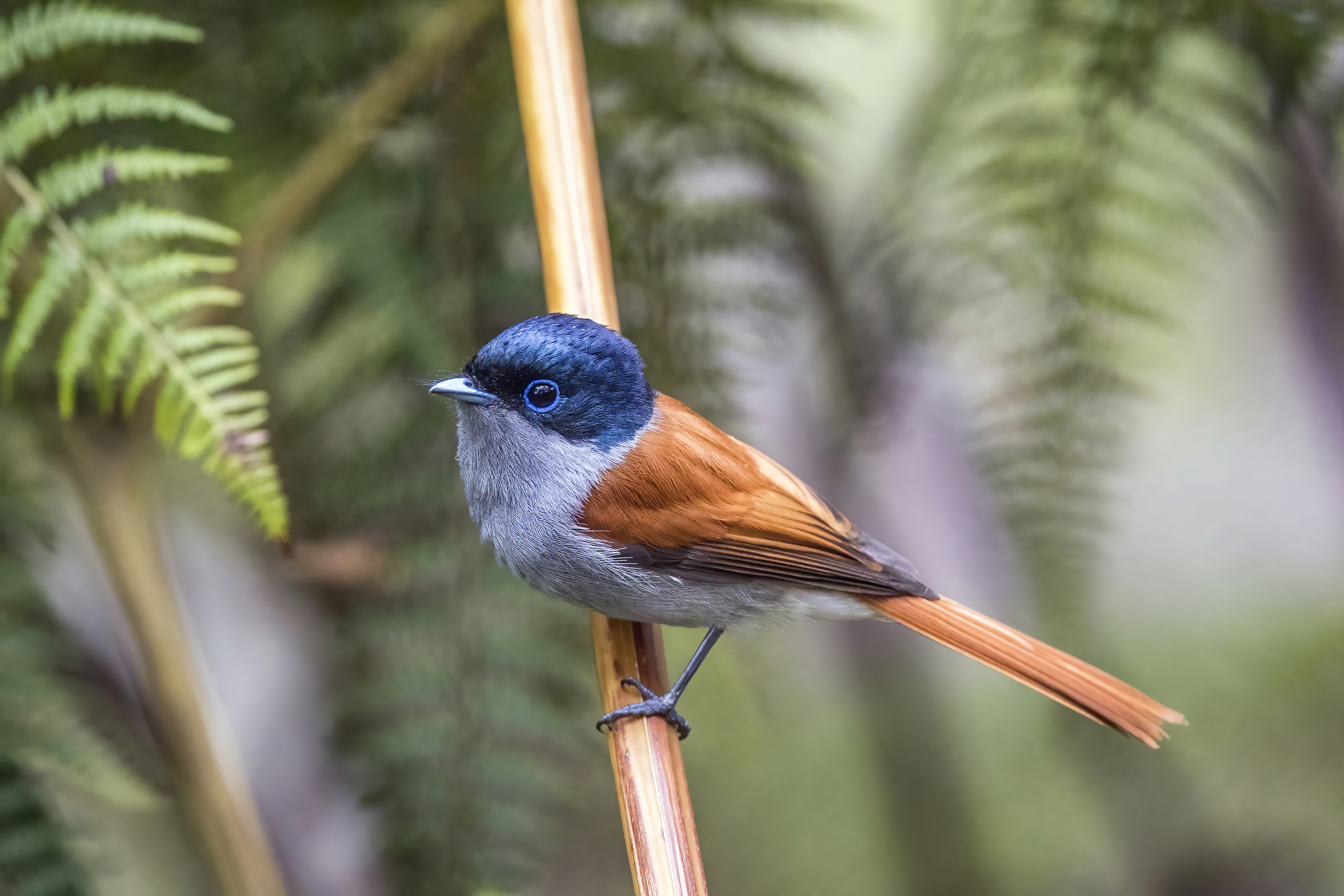
- Male Réunion paradise flycatcher, Terpsiphone bourbonnensis bourbonnensis

Scientific classification
- Kingdom: Animalia
- Phylum: Chordata
- Class: Aves
- Order: Passeriformes
- Family: Monarchidae
- Genus: Terpsiphone; Gloger, 1827

Type species
- Corvus paradisi Linnaeus, 1758

Species
- See text

Synonyms
- Callaeops; Muscipeta; Tchitrea; Xeocephalus; Xeocephus; Zeocephus

Audio
- Song of the African paradise flycatcher

= Paradise flycatcher =

Paradise flycatchers

Genus of birds

The paradise flycatchers (Terpsiphone) are a genus of birds in the family Monarchidae. The genus ranges across Africa and Asia, as well as a number of islands. A few species are migratory, but the majority are resident. The most telling characteristic of the genus is the long tail streamers of the males of many species. In addition to the long tails the males and females are sexually dimorphic and have rufous, black and white plumage.

== Taxonomy and systematics ==
The genus Terpsiphone was introduced by the German zoologist Constantin Gloger in 1827. The type species was subsequently designated as the Indian paradise flycatcher. The name is from the Ancient Greek terpsi "delighting in" and phonos "voice".

The genus contains 16 species:

| Image | Common name | Scientific name | Distribution |
|---|---|---|---|
| | Bedford's paradise flycatcher | Terpsiphone bedfordi | Democratic Republic of the Congo. |
| | Rufous-vented paradise flycatcher | Terpsiphone rufocinerea | Cameroon, Democratic Republic of the Congo, and north-western Angola |
| | Red-bellied paradise flycatcher | Terpsiphone rufiventer | intra-tropical forests of Africa. |
| | Bates's paradise flycatcher | Terpsiphone batesi | Angola, Cameroon, Gabon to eastern Democratic Republic of Congo |
| | African paradise flycatcher | Terpsiphone viridis | Africa south of the Sahara Desert and also the Arabian Peninsula |
| | Indian paradise flycatcher | Terpsiphone paradisi | tropical Asia. |
| | Blyth's paradise flycatcher | Terpsiphone affinis | China to Sumatra and Melanesia. |
| | Tenggara paradise flycatcher | Terpsiphone floris | Lesser Sundas |
| | Amur paradise flycatcher | Terpsiphone incei | China, Manchuria and Primorsky Krai in the Russian Far East. |
| | Black paradise flycatcher or Japanese paradise flycatcher | Terpsiphone atrocaudata | China, Thailand, Laos, Vietnam, other parts of the Philippines, Malaysia, Singapore, and Sumatra, Indonesia. |
| | Blue paradise flycatcher | Terpsiphone cyanescens | Philippines (Palawan) |
| | Rufous paradise flycatcher | Terpsiphone cinnamomea | Indonesia and the Philippines. |
| | São Tomé paradise flycatcher | Terpsiphone atrochalybeia | São Tomé Island |
| | Malagasy paradise flycatcher | Terpsiphone mutata | Comoros, Madagascar, and Mayotte. |
| | Seychelles paradise flycatcher | Terpsiphone corvina | La Digue, Seychelles |
| | Mascarene paradise flycatcher | Terpsiphone bourbonnensis | Mauritius and Réunion. |

=== Former species ===
Formerly, some authorities also considered the following species (or subspecies) as species within the genus Terpsiphone:

- Cerulean flycatcher (as Zeocephus rowleyi)
- Blue-mantled crested flycatcher (as Terpsiphone cyanomelas)
- Blue-headed crested flycatcher (as Terpsiphone nitens)
- Rufous monarch (as Tchitrea rubiensis)

== Description ==
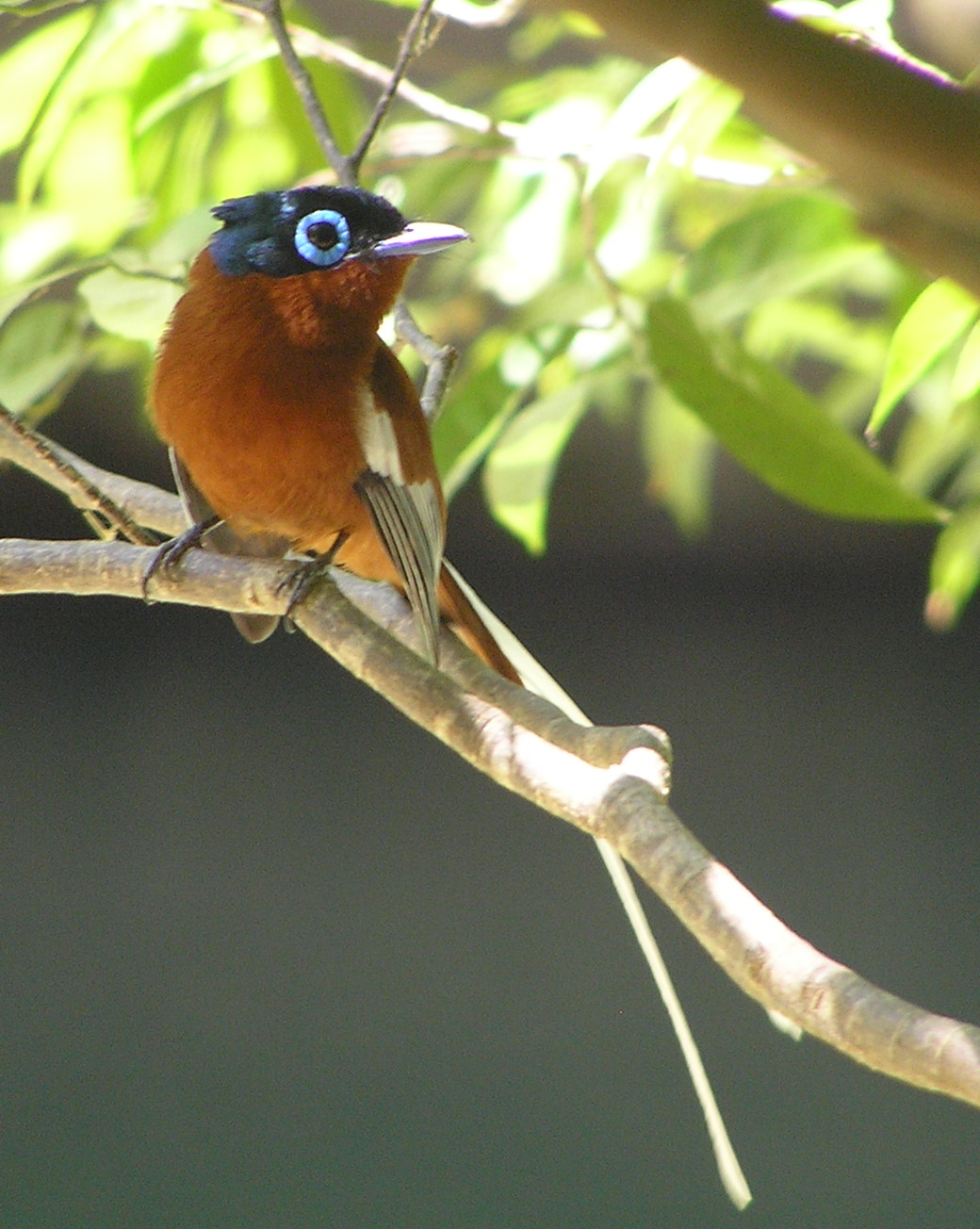
The male Malagasy paradise flycatcher has the typical blue eye-ring and long tail

The paradise flycatchers are generally small birds, around 18 to 21 cm (7.1–8.3 in) in length and weighing 12 to 23 g (0.42–0.81 oz). They have a medium length grey or blueish bill which is broad and hooked at the end and is surrounded by stiff rictal bristles. The inside of the mouths of paradise-flycatchers are brightly coloured, being either yellow or green. The tails are long, particularly in many species where the male has a massively elongated pair of middle tail feathers. These tail streamers are 195 mm long in the male São Tomé paradise flycatcher and 412 mm long in the male Indian paradise flycatcher. The function of the long tail is assumed to be related to sexual selection, with females choosing males based on the length of the tail. Not all species have long tail streamers, for example the blue paradise flycatcher of Palawan in Asia and the Bedford's paradise flycatcher of montane Africa do not have exceptionally long tails. In most species the tail is longer than the wing, even in the shorter tailed females. The eye is surrounded by an eyering that is a blue thin wattle (slightly more pronounced in some species like the rufous paradise flycatcher).

The plumage of the paradise flycatchers is sexually dimorphic, with rufous, white and black being the most common colours; one species has blue plumage and a few have traces of maroon. Sexual dimorphism can be pronounced (and of course more so in the long-tailed males) or subtle; the female Bedford's paradise flycatcher is identical to the male except slightly duller. Some species sport prominent crests. In some species, for example the Malagasy paradise flycatcher, the males have two or more colour morphs.

=== Calls and song ===
The paradise flycatchers make a range of vocalisations, these range from whistling songs to harsher calls. These songs and calls are typical of the monarch flycatchers. The songs are simpler in the Asian species, for example the call of the Japanese paradise flycatcher is a repeated three syllable whistle. The songs of the African species are more complex and, in the case of species with a large range, vary geographically. The calls are generally simple and are harsh and grating.

== Distribution and habitat ==
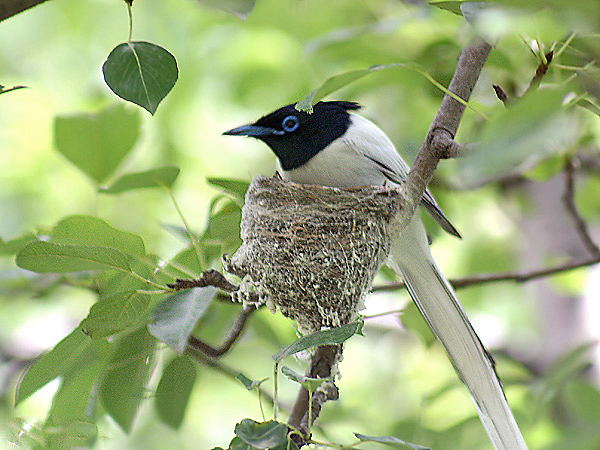
A white-morph male Indian paradise flycatcher incubating on the nest

The paradise flycatchers have the widest distribution of any of the monarch flycatchers, ranging across sub-Saharan Africa, the Indian subcontinent, Southeast Asia and East Asia. At the northern extreme of its range it reaches Korea and Afghanistan. The species also occurs on a number of islands, including those of Indonesia and the Philippines, Taiwan, and Japan, as well as Madagascar, the Mascarenes and the Seychelles in the Indian Ocean and São Tomé off Africa's Atlantic coast.

Several species of paradise flycatcher are migratory. The Japanese paradise flycatcher is almost entirely migratory, breeding in Korea and Japan and wintering in the Philippines, Malaysia and Sumatra. It does however also occur in Taiwan, where the population is apparently resident. The Indian paradise flycatcher ranges across the Indian subcontinent and adjoining regions. The movements of the other species are not fully understood, but most are thought to be resident. Several subspecies of the African paradise flycatcher are apparently intra-African migrants, but little is known about these movements.

The paradise flycatchers inhabit a range of habitat types, from rainforest to montane forest, woodlands, savanna, mangroves, riparian forest, deciduous forests and bamboo groves, some species will also move into gardens and cultivated habitat.

== Behaviour ==
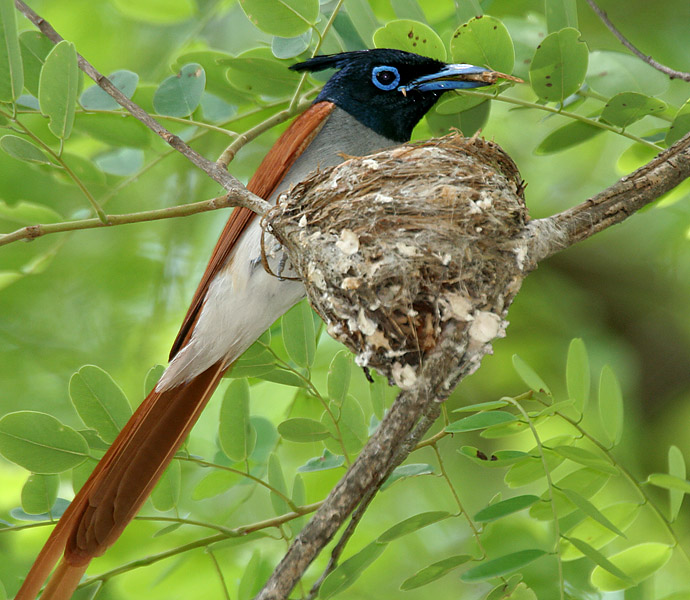
A rufous-morph male Indian paradise flycatcher Terpsiphone paradisi with a feed at nest at Ananthagiri Hills, in Rangareddy district of Andhra Pradesh, India.

=== Breeding ===
Paradise flycatchers, like all monarch flycatchers, are monogamous and are generally territorial, although in some cases birds may nest close together and defend the nests together against predators. Females apparently select males based on their tail length, a form of sexual selection. Paradise flycatchers are unusual as exaggerated sexual traits are usually found in promiscuous birds, not monogamous ones. The nests of this genus are neat deep cups placed on a branch or twig, often in a fork. They are usually placed 1–3 m off the ground. They are often very conspicuous, particularly when the long-tailed males are incubating. The nests are, however, aggressively defended by the pair. Amongst the pair duties are shared but not equally. For example, in the Malagasy paradise flycatcher the female undertakes more brooding responsibilities whereas the male spends more time guarding the nest.

=== Food and feeding ===
The paradise flycatchers are, as their name suggests, insectivores, feeding on a variety of insects, usually obtained on the wing. They use a variety of foraging techniques, including hawking from a perch, sallying, hovering, gleaning, and flush-pursuiting. They will join mixed-species feeding flocks, for example the Madagascar paradise flycatcher will regularly form small two species flocks with the common newtonia while foraging.
