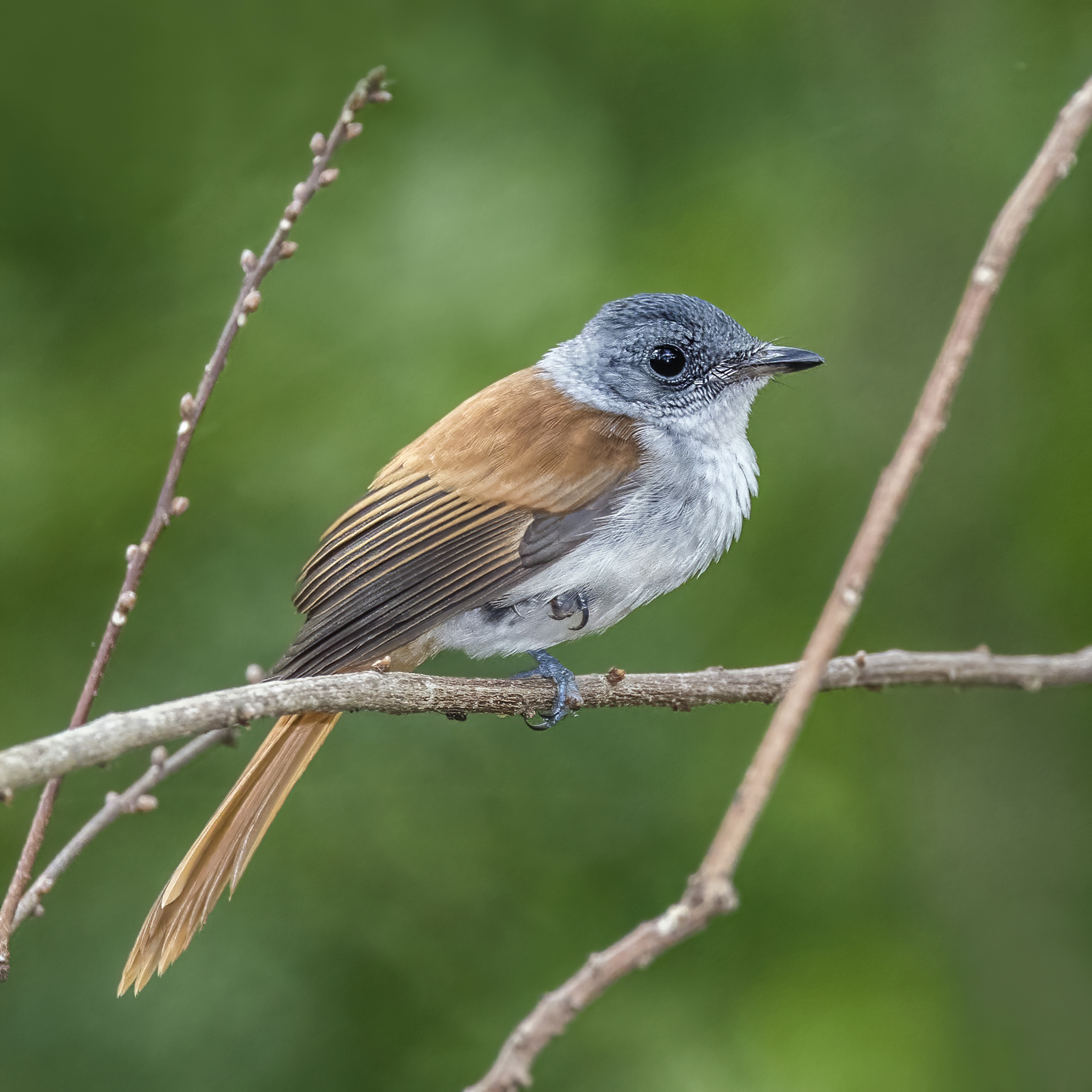
- Female, São Tomé island

Conservation status
- Least Concern (IUCN 3.1)

Scientific classification
- Kingdom: Animalia
- Phylum: Chordata
- Class: Aves
- Order: Passeriformes
- Family: Monarchidae
- Genus: Terpsiphone
- Species: T. atrochalybeia

Binomial name
- Terpsiphone atrochalybeia (Thomson, 1842)

Synonyms
- Tchitrea atrochalybeia (protonym)

= São Tomé paradise flycatcher =

Species of bird

The São Tomé paradise flycatcher (Terpsiphone atrochalybeia), also known as São Tomé flycatcher, is a species of bird in the family Monarchidae. The species was described by Thomas Richard Heywood Thomson in 1842, with Tchitrea atrochalybeia the binomial and Fernando Po given as the type locality. The species is endemic to São Tomé Island. Its natural habitats are subtropical or tropical dry forests and subtropical or tropical moist lowland forests.
