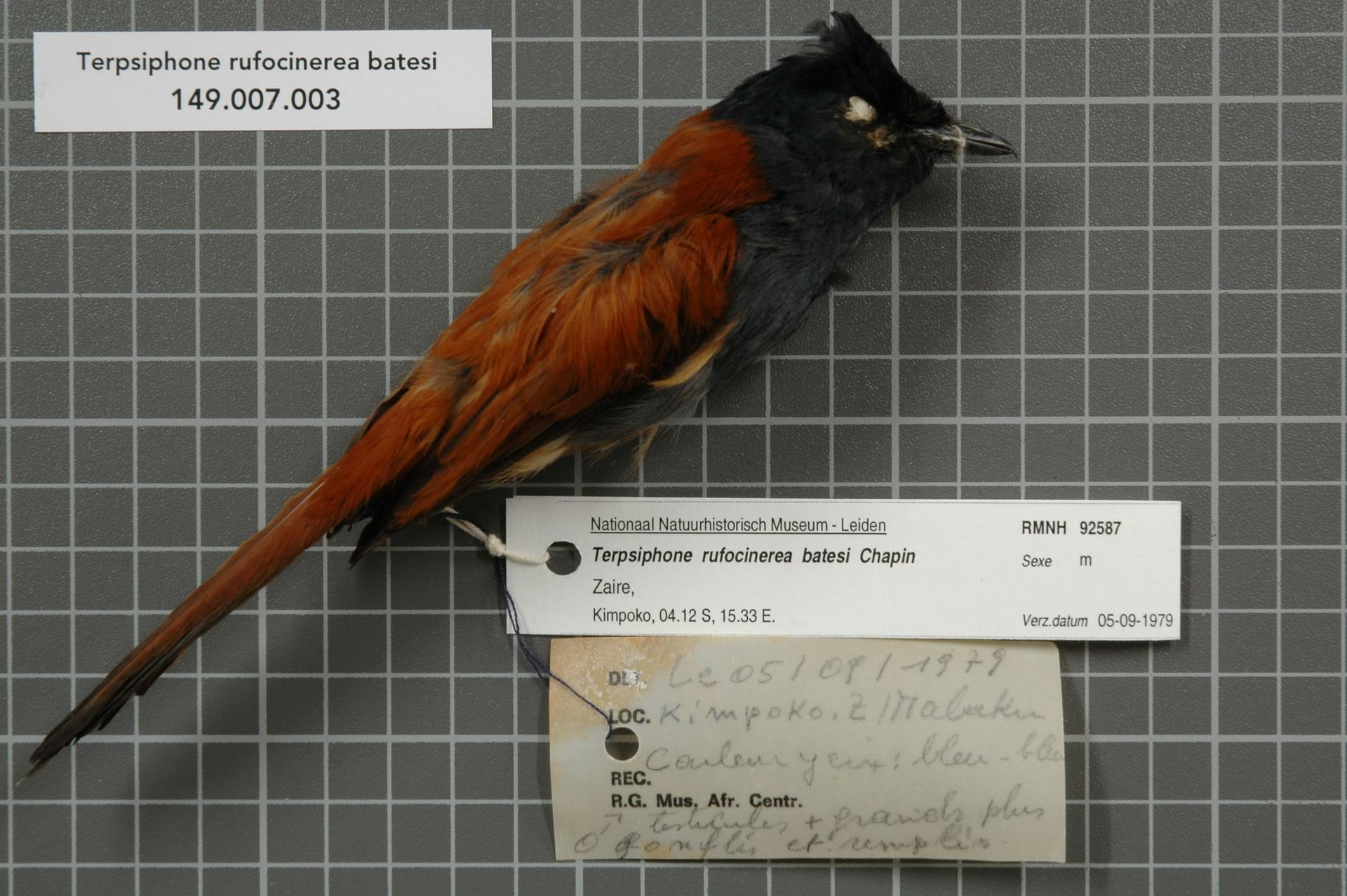
- preserved specimen
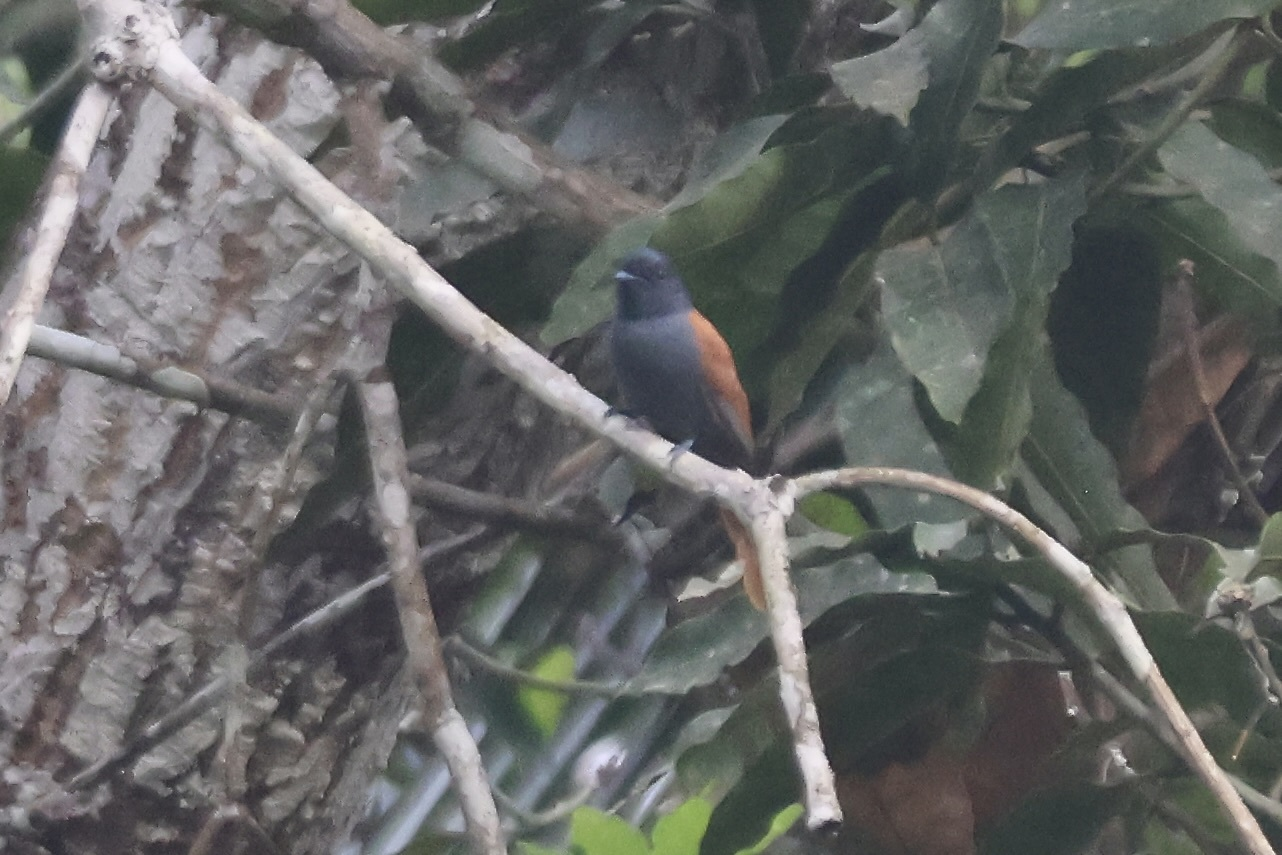

Conservation status
- Least Concern (IUCN 3.1)

Scientific classification
- Kingdom: Animalia
- Phylum: Chordata
- Class: Aves
- Order: Passeriformes
- Family: Monarchidae
- Genus: Terpsiphone
- Species: T. batesi

Binomial name
- Terpsiphone batesi Chapin, 1921

Subspecies
- See text

Synonyms
- Terpsiphone rufocinerea batesi

= Bates's paradise flycatcher =

Species of bird

Bates's paradise flycatcher (Terpsiphone batesi) is a passerine bird belonging to the monarch-flycatcher family, Monarchidae. The sexes are similar in appearance with the upper parts being rufous and the head and underparts being bluish-grey. It is native to central Africa where it is found in the understorey of forests.

== Taxonomy and systematics ==
Its name commemorates the American ornithologist George Latimer Bates. Bates's paradise flycatcher was formerly considered as a subspecies of the rufous-vented paradise flycatcher but is now recognized as a separate species. An alternate name is the Cameroon rufous-vented paradise-flycatcher.

=== Subspecies ===
There are two subspecies recognized:

- T. b. batesi – Chapin, 1921: Found from southern Cameroon and Gabon to eastern Democratic Republic of Congo
- Bannerman's paradise-flycatcher (T. b. bannermani) – Chapin, 1948: Formerly considered by some authorities as a separate species. Found in Congo, southwestern Democratic Republic of Congo and northern Angola

== Description ==
Bates's paradise flycatcher is usually 18 centimetres long but males in parts of Cameroon and Angola have elongated central tail-feathers making them 23-28 centimetres long. The head and underparts are blue-grey while the upperparts are rufous. The sexes are similar in coloration. The song is a series of ringing "tswee" notes.

The rufous-vented paradise flycatcher is similar in appearance but has a darker head with a crest and males always have elongated central tail-feathers.

== Distribution ==
It inhabits the understorey of forests. It occurs from Cameroon and the south-western Central African Republic through Equatorial Guinea, Gabon, the Republic of the Congo and much of the Democratic Republic of the Congo south as far as north-west Angola.
