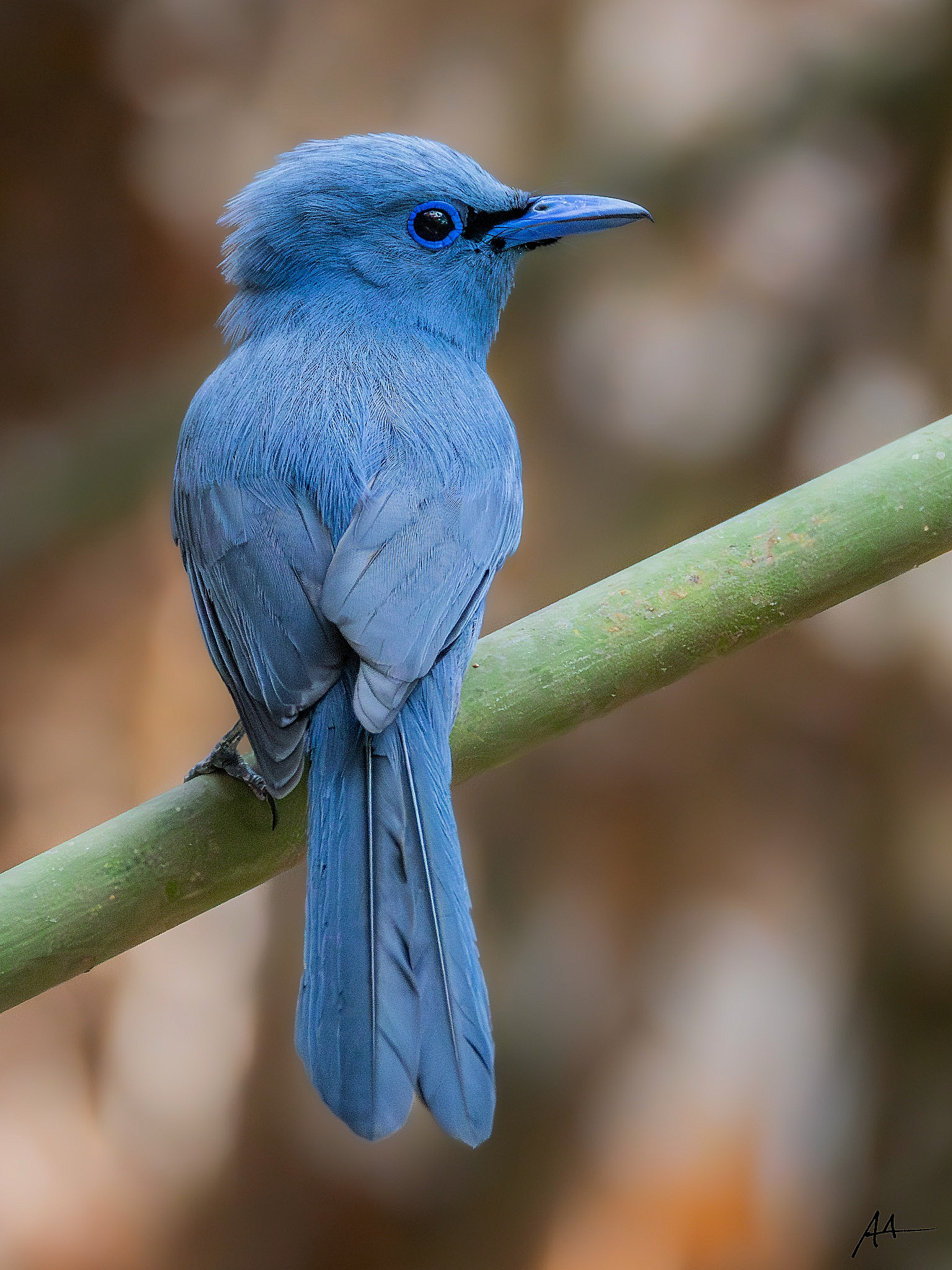
- Male
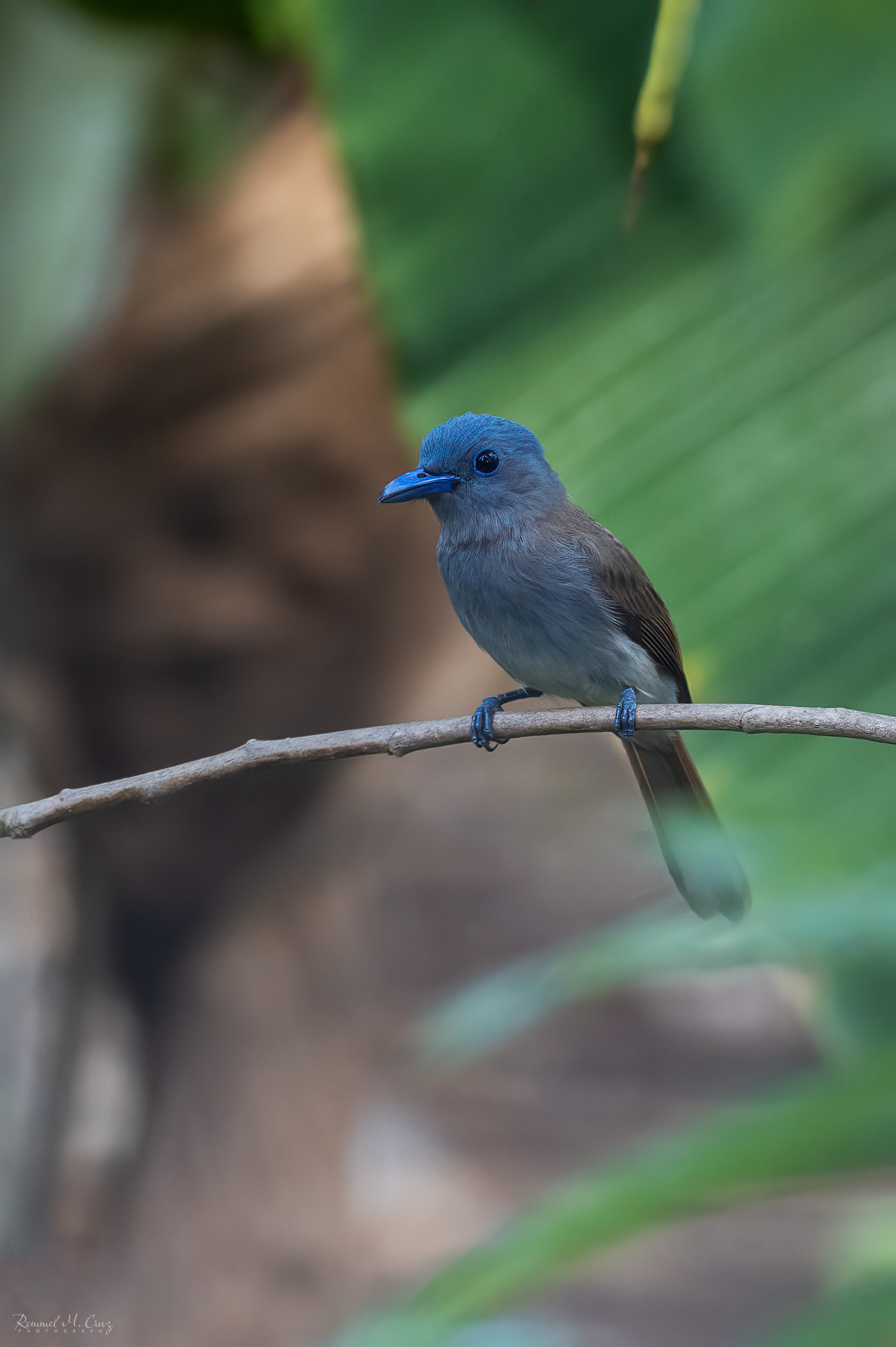
- Female

Conservation status
- Least Concern (IUCN 3.1)

Scientific classification
- Kingdom: Animalia
- Phylum: Chordata
- Class: Aves
- Order: Passeriformes
- Family: Monarchidae
- Genus: Terpsiphone
- Species: T. cyanescens

Binomial name
- Terpsiphone cyanescens (Sharpe, 1877)

Synonyms
- Zeocephus cyanescens

= Blue paradise flycatcher =

Species of bird

The blue paradise flycatcher (Terpsiphone cyanescens) is a species of bird in the family Monarchidae. It is endemic to Palawan. It is mainly found in the understory of lowland primary and secondary forests, however populations are likely to be declining owing to habitat loss.

== Description ==
This species is monotypic and has no subspecies.

== Ecology and behavior ==
It feeds on insects but otherwise not much is known about the specifics of its diet. Forages from ground level up to 15 meters high. Only 1 nest has been found in July, 2 meters above ground with a single creamy white egg with brown spotting. No other breeding information is available.

== Habitat and conservation status ==
The species inhabits tropical moist lowland primary forest and secondary forest up restricted to the lowlands.

It is assessed as least-concern under the IUCN with populations believed to be decreasing due to habitat loss and deforestation. The whole of Palawan was designated as a Biosphere Reserve; however, protection and enforcement of laws has been difficult and these threats still continue. It occurs in the protected area of Puerto Princesa Subterranean River National Park.
