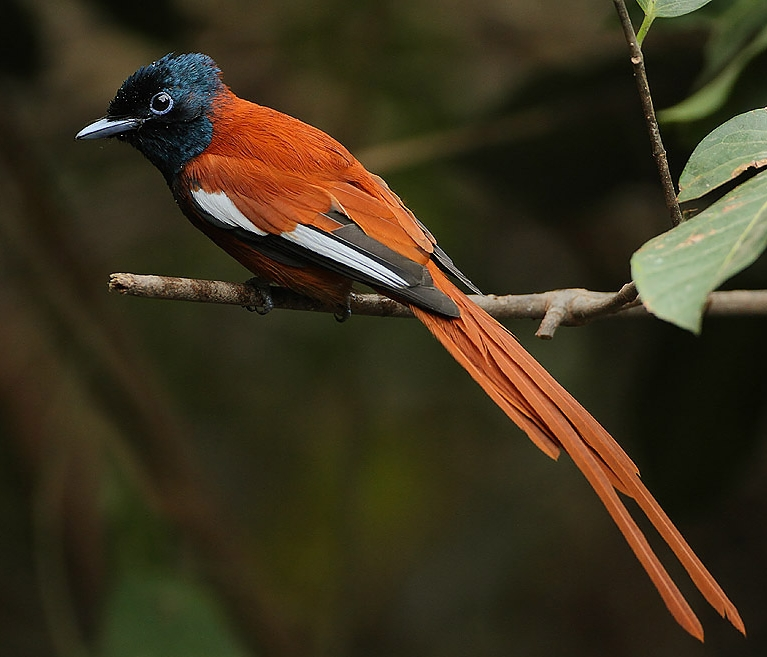

Conservation status
- Least Concern (IUCN 3.1)

Scientific classification
- Kingdom: Animalia
- Phylum: Chordata
- Class: Aves
- Order: Passeriformes
- Family: Monarchidae
- Genus: Terpsiphone
- Species: T. rufiventer

Binomial name
- Terpsiphone rufiventer (Swainson, 1837)

Synonyms
- Muscipeta rufiventer

= Red-bellied paradise flycatcher =

Species of bird

The red-bellied paradise flycatcher (Terpsiphone rufiventer), also known as the black-headed paradise flycatcher, is a medium-sized passerine bird of the family of monarch flycatchers. It is native to intra-tropical forests of Africa. The male bird is about 17 cm (7 in) long and has a black head, a mainly chestnut body, and a tail with streamers nearly twice as long as the body. The colouring is somewhat variable across the bird's range. Both females and juveniles lack the tail streamers and are a duller brown colour. It is closely related to the African paradise flycatcher, and the two can hybridise.

== Taxonomy ==
The red-bellied paradise flycatcher was formally described and illustrated in 1837 by the English zoologist William Swainson under the binomial name Muscipeta rufiventer. Although Swainson was describing birds from West Africa, the type locality has been restricted to Senegal. The specific epithet is Modern Latin meaning "red-bellied" from Latin rufus meaning "ruddy" or "rufous" and venter, ventris meaning "belly". The red-bellied paradise flycatcher is now one of 16 paradise flycatchers placed in the genus Terpsiphone that was introduced in 1827 by the German zoologist Constantin Gloger.

Eleven subspecies are recognised:

- T. r. rufiventer (Swainson, 1837) – Senegal, Gambia and west Guinea
- T. r. nigriceps (Hartlaub, 1855) – Sierra Leone and Guinea to Togo and southwest Benin
- T. r. fagani (Bannerman, 1921) – Benin and southwest Nigeria
- T. r. tricolor (Fraser, 1843) – Bioko (island in Gulf of Guinea)
- T. r. neumanni Stresemann, 1924 – southeast Nigeria to north Angola
- T. r. schubotzi (Reichenow, 1911) – southeast Cameroon and southwest Central African Republic
- T. r. mayombe (Chapin, 1932) – Congo and west DR Congo
- T. r. somereni Chapin, 1948 – west, south Uganda
- T. r. emini Reichenow, 1893 – southeast Uganda, west Kenya and northwest Tanzania
- T. r. ignea (Reichenow, 1901) – east Central African Republic, DR Congo, northeast Angola and northwest Zambia
- T. r. smithii (Fraser, 1843) – Annobón Island (south Gulf of Guinea) (Annobón paradise flycatcher)

The subspecies T. r. smithii has sometimes been considered as a separate species, the Annobón paradise flycatcher.
