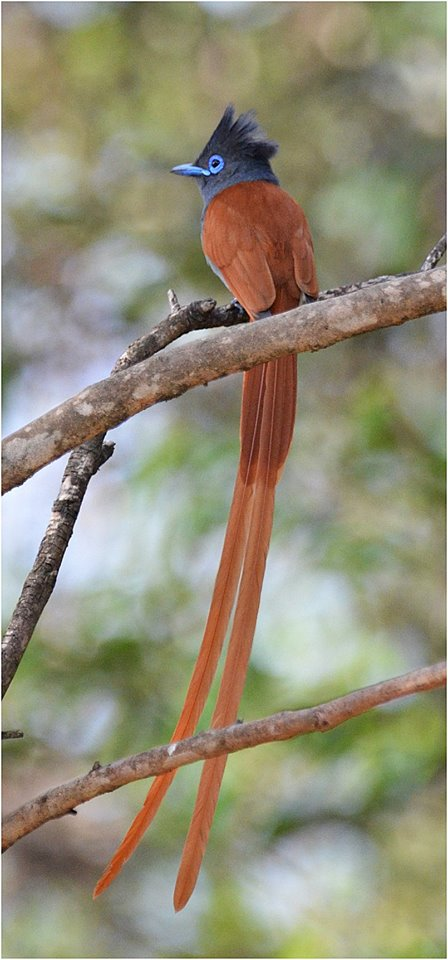

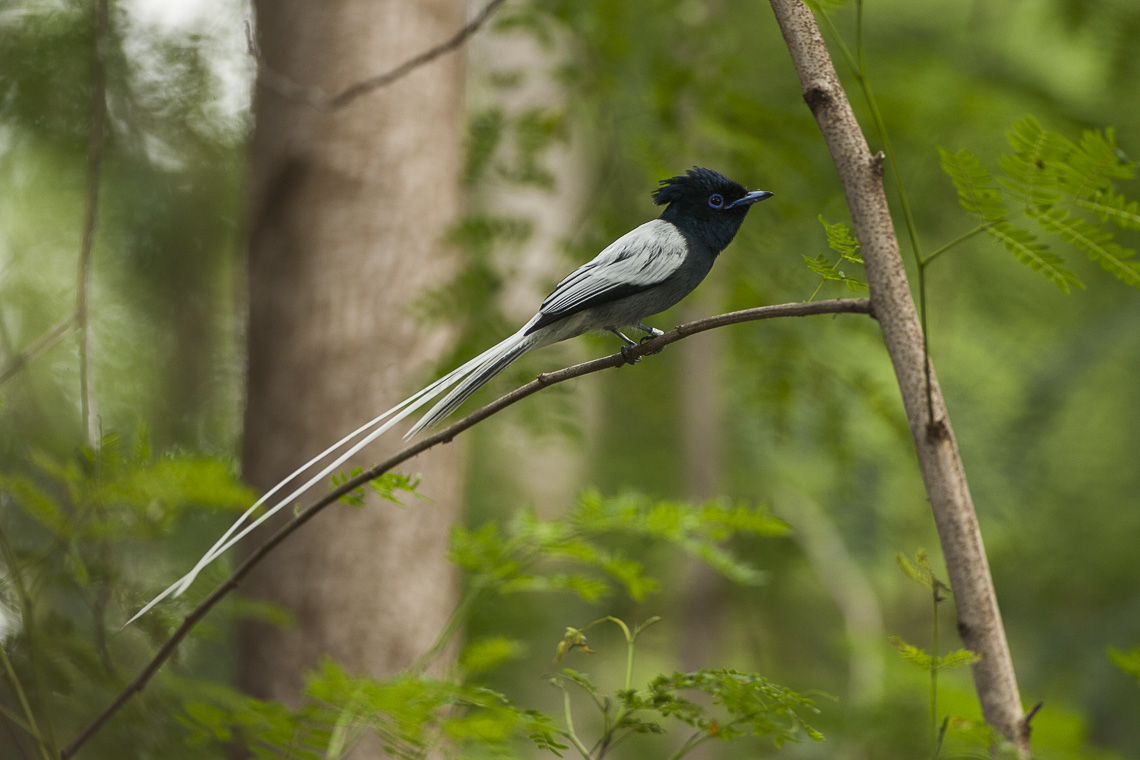
- Males, brown and white morphs

Conservation status
- Least Concern (IUCN 3.1)

Scientific classification
- Kingdom: Animalia
- Phylum: Chordata
- Class: Aves
- Order: Passeriformes
- Family: Monarchidae
- Genus: Terpsiphone
- Species: T. viridis

Binomial name
- Terpsiphone viridis (Müller, 1776)

Subspecies
- See text

Synonyms
- Muscicapa viridis; Terpsiphone granti; Terpsiphone perspicillata; Terpsiphone poliothorax; Terpsiphone suahelica

= African paradise flycatcher =

Species of bird

The African paradise flycatcher (Terpsiphone viridis) is a medium-sized passerine bird. The two central tail feathers of the male are extended into streamers that commonly are more than twice as long as the body. The female tail feathers are of moderate length and without streamers. The upper parts of the male body, wings, and tail are boldly coloured in chestnut or rusty shades, but the underparts and the head are variably grey to blue-gray, with the head of the mature male being darker, commonly glossy black with greenish highlights. The beak and other bare areas, including a wattle ring round the eye, match the colour of the surrounding feathers. The female coloration is similar, though not so showy and glossy and with the head paler.

The African paradise flycatcher feeds mainly on insects. It builds a neat cup nest in which it lays a clutch, usually of two or three eggs. It generally inhabits open forest and savanna, and is a locally common resident breeder in Africa south of the Sahara. The International Union for Conservation of Nature has listed it as being of "least concern".

This is the original bird known as ọ̀kín in Yorùbá language instead of the peacock.

== Taxonomy and systematics ==
The African paradise flycatcher was originally described in the genus Muscicapa. Alternate names include the grey-headed paradise flycatcher, red-winged paradise-flycatcher and Southern paradise-flycatcher.

=== Subspecies ===
Ten subspecies are recognized:

- T. v. harterti - (Meinertzhagen, R, 1923): Found on southern Arabian Peninsula
- T. v. viridis - (Müller, 1776): Found from Senegal and Gambia to Sierra Leone
- T. v. speciosa - (Cassin, 1859): Originally described as a separate species. Found from southern Cameroon to south-western Sudan, Democratic Republic of Congo and north-eastern Angola
- Abyssinian paradise-flycatcher (T. v. ferreti) - (Guérin-Méneville, 1843): Originally described as a separate species. Found from Mali and the Ivory Coast to Somalia, Kenya and Tanzania
- T. v. restricta - (Salomonsen, 1933): Found in southern Uganda
- T. v. kivuensis - (Salomonsen, 1949): Found from south-western Uganda to eastern Democratic Republic of Congo and north-western Tanzania
- Swaheli paradise-flycatcher (T. v. suahelica) - Reichenow, 1898: Formerly classified as a separate species by some authorities. Found in western Kenya and northern Tanzania
- T. v. ungujaensis - (Grant, CHB & Mackworth-Praed, 1947): Found in eastern Tanzania and nearby islands
- T. v. plumbeiceps - Reichenow, 1898: Originally described as a separate species. Found from Angola to south-western Tanzania, Mozambique and northern South Africa
- T. v. granti - (Roberts, 1948): Originally described as a separate species. Found in eastern and southern South Africa

== Description ==
The adult male African paradise flycatcher is about 17 cm (6.7 in) long, but the very long tail streamers double this. It has a black head, neck and underparts, and chestnut wings and tail. There is a prominent white wingbar. The female has a browner tint to the underparts and lacks the wingbar and tail streamers. Young birds are similar to the female but duller.

The males show considerable variation in plumage in some areas. There is a morph of this species in which the male has the chestnut parts of the plumage replaced by white, and some races have black tail streamers.

This species readily hybridizes with the genetically similar Rufous-vented paradise flycatcher. The red-bellied paradise flycatcher is also closely related to this species, and hybrids occur with the underparts a mixture of black and red.

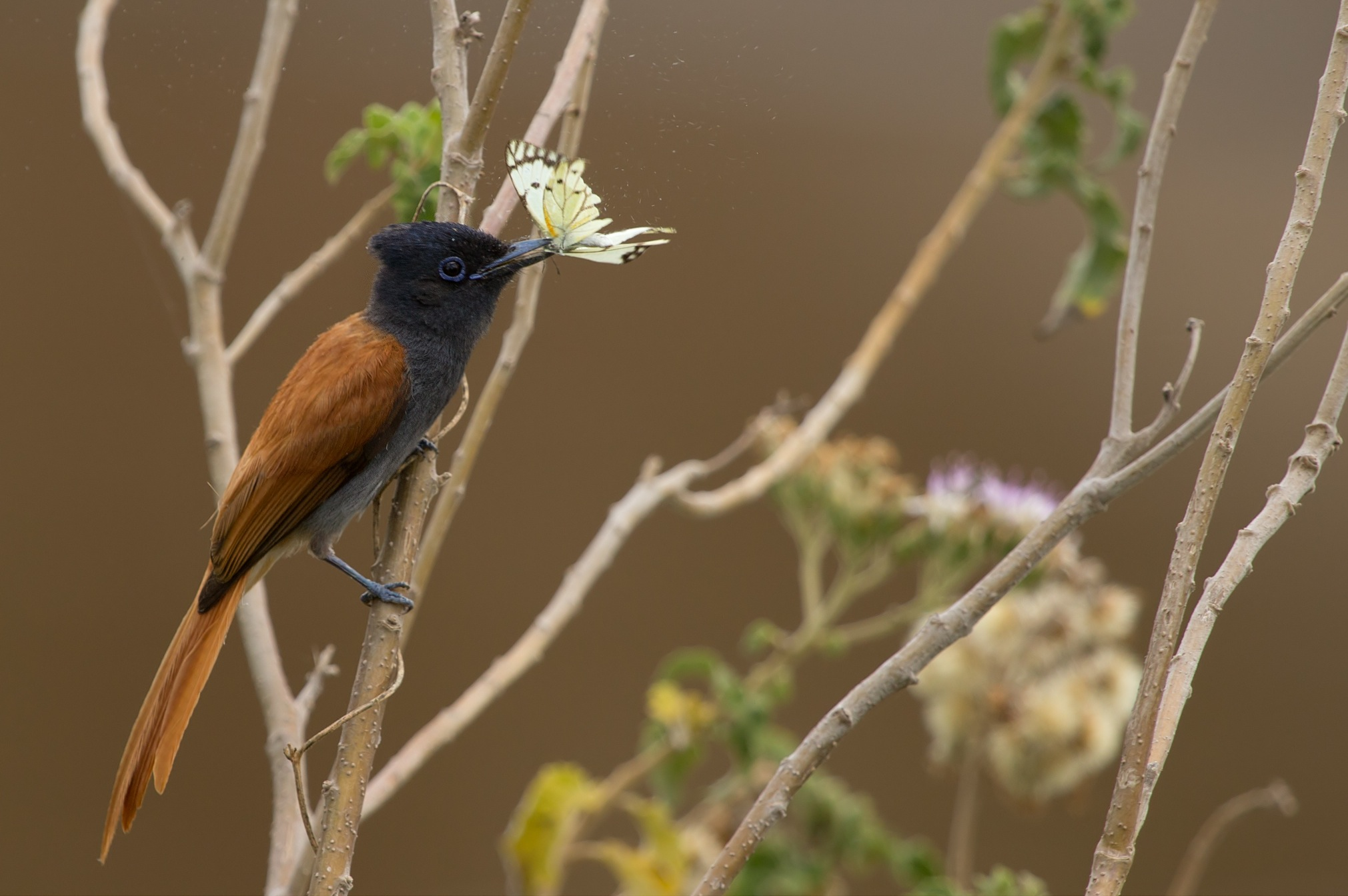
With a butterfly catch
Masai Mara

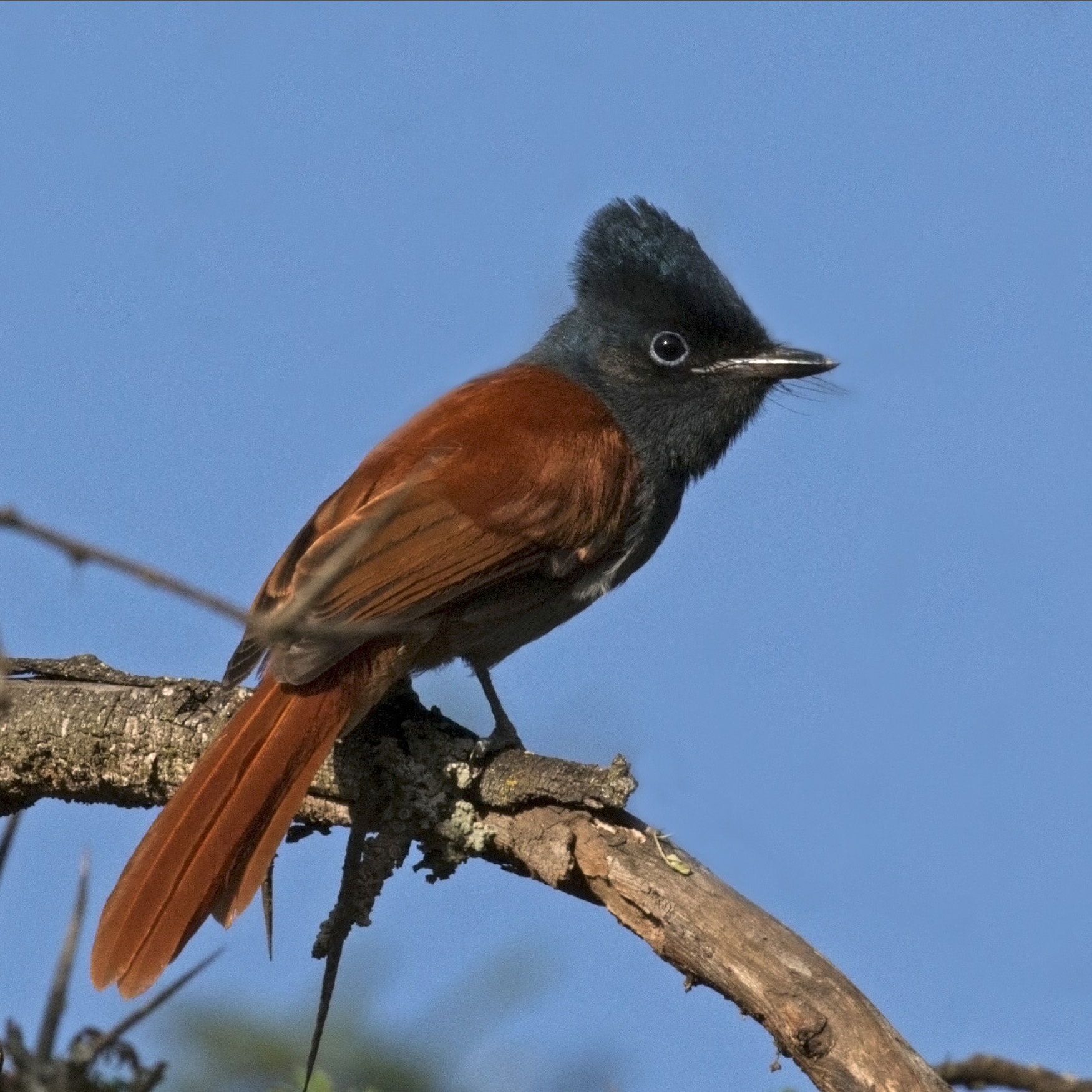
female rufous morph, Soysambu Conservancy, Kenya

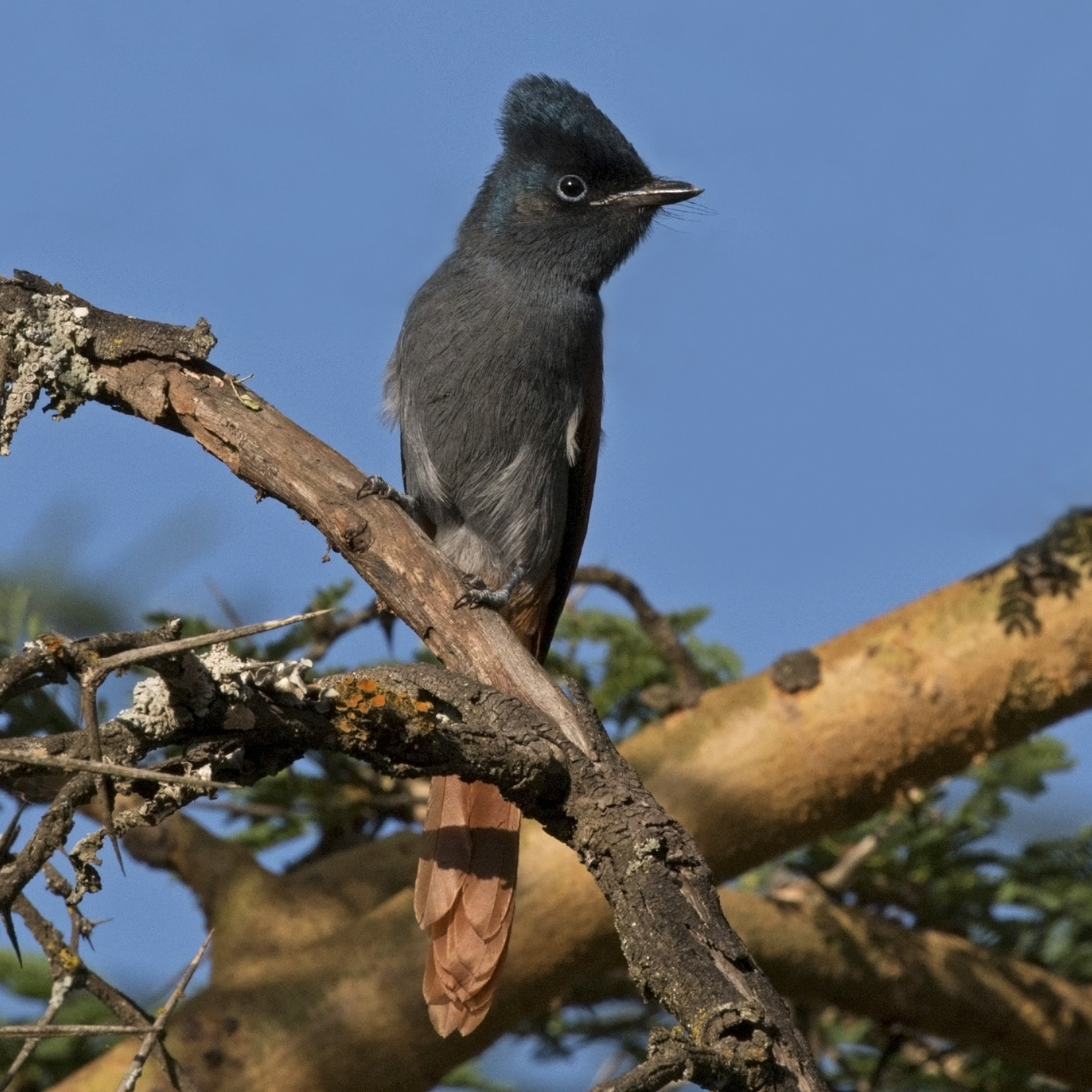
female rufous morph, Soysambu Conservancy, Kenya

African Paradise Flycatcher song, recorded in Giants Castle Reserve, KwaZulu-Natal, South Africa

== Distribution and habitat ==
The African paradise flycatcher is found in most parts of Africa south of the Sahara Desert and also the Arabian Peninsula. Its typical habitat is savannah woodland, open grassland with isolated trees, plantations, open woodland and scrubland.

== Behaviour ==
The African paradise flycatcher is a noisy bird with a harsh scolding call. It has short legs and sits very upright whilst perched prominently, like a shrike. It is insectivorous, often hunting by catching flies on the wing, and eating eggs, larvae and adults. It also feeds on spiders and sometimes consumes berries. The cup-shaped nest is built in a tree and a clutch of two or three eggs are laid.
