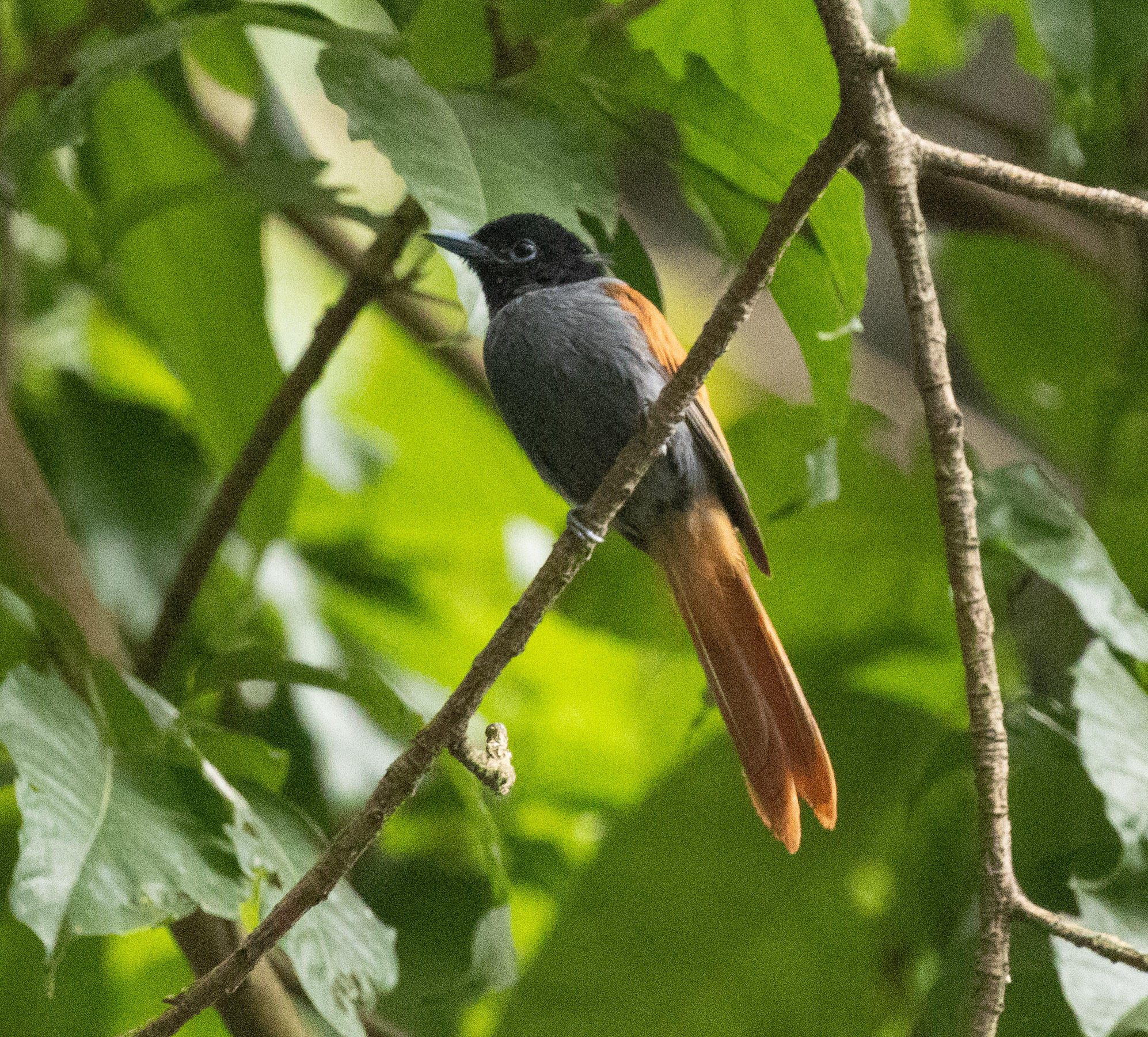

Conservation status
- Least Concern (IUCN 3.1)

Scientific classification
- Kingdom: Animalia
- Phylum: Chordata
- Class: Aves
- Order: Passeriformes
- Family: Monarchidae
- Genus: Terpsiphone
- Species: T. rufocinerea

Binomial name
- Terpsiphone rufocinerea Cabanis, 1875

= Rufous-vented paradise flycatcher =

Species of bird

The rufous-vented paradise flycatcher (Terpsiphone rufocinerea) is a species of bird in the family Monarchidae. It is found from southern Cameroon to eastern and central Democratic Republic of the Congo and north-western Angola. This species readily hybridizes with the genetically similar African paradise flycatcher. Its natural habitats are subtropical or tropical swamps and shrub-dominated wetlands.
