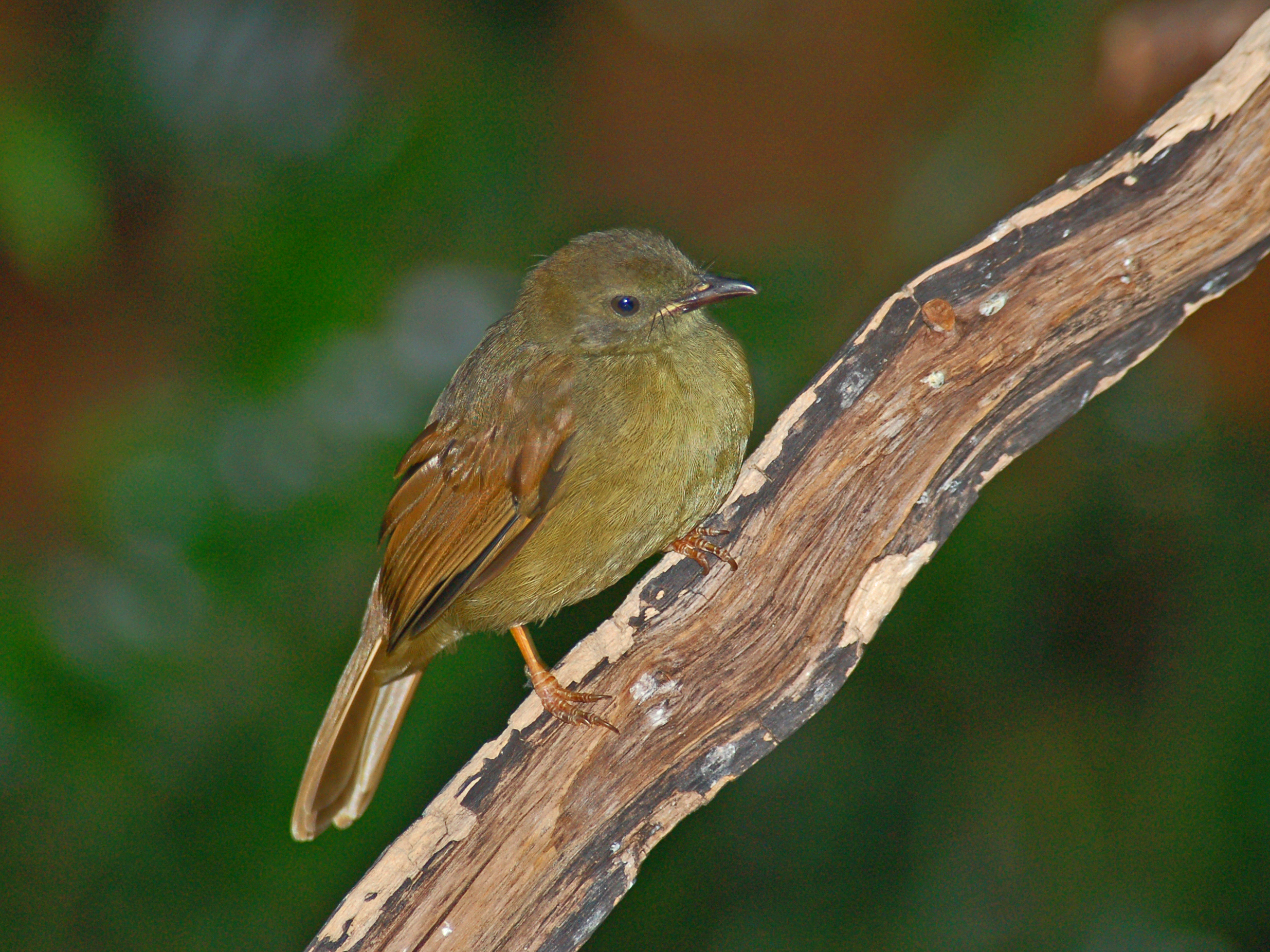
- Little greenbul, Eurillas virens

Scientific classification
- Kingdom: Animalia
- Phylum: Chordata
- Class: Aves
- Order: Passeriformes
- Family: Pycnonotidae
- Genus: Eurillas; Oberholser, 1899

Type species
- Andropadus virens (Little greenbul) Cassin, 1857

Species
- See text
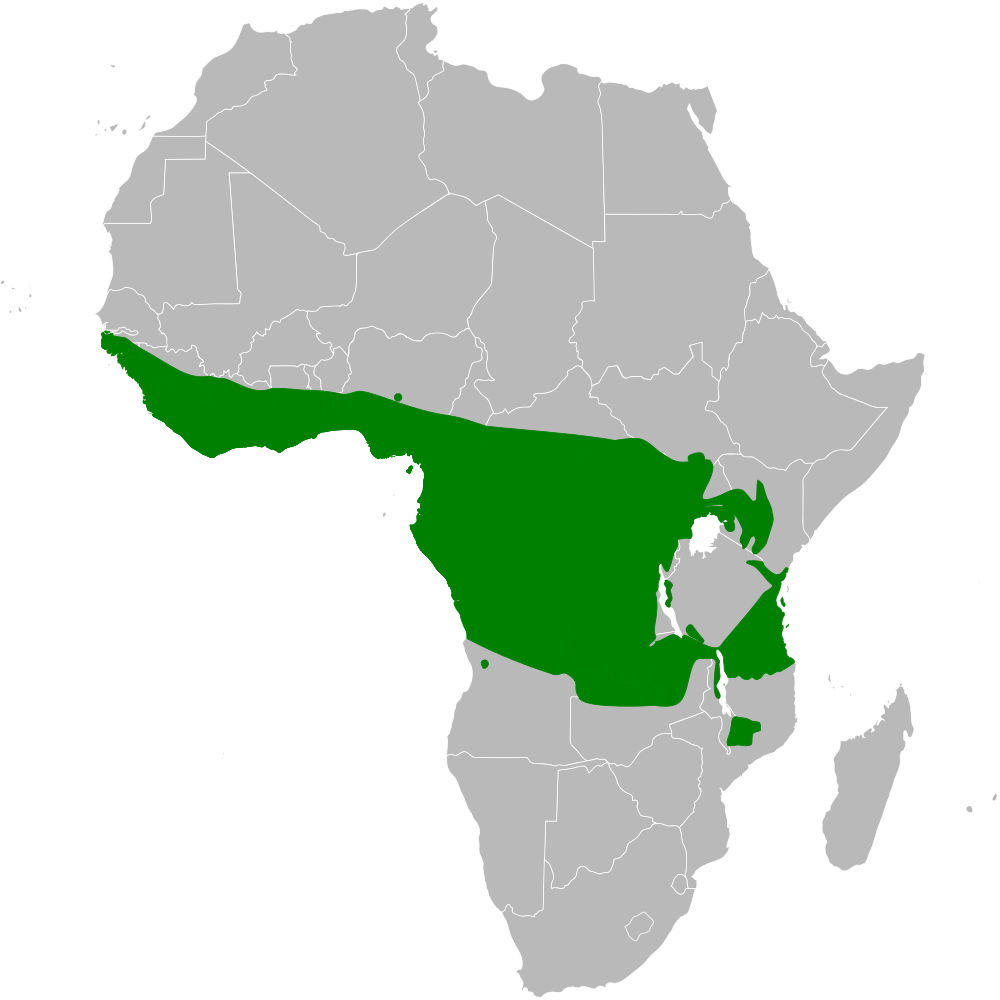

= Eurillas =

Genus of birds

Eurillas is a genus of greenbuls, passerine birds in the bulbul family Pycnonotidae.

== Taxonomy ==
The genus Eurillas was introduced in 1899 by the American ornithologist Harry C. Oberholser with the little greenbul as the type species. The genus name combines the Ancient Greek eurus meaning "broad" or "wide" and illas meaning "thrush".

This genus was formerly synonymized with the genus Andropadus. A molecular phylogenetic study of the bulbul family published in 2007 found that Andropadus was polyphyletic. In the revision to the generic classification five species were moved from Andropadus to the resurrected genus Eurillas.

=== Species ===
The genus contains the following five species:

Image	Scientific name	Common name	Distribution
	Little greenbul	Eurillas virens	African tropical rainforest and neighbouring areas
	Yellow-whiskered greenbul	Eurillas latirostris	African tropical rainforest
	Plain greenbul	Eurillas curvirostris	African tropical rainforest
	Little grey greenbul	Eurillas gracilis	African tropical rainforest
	Ansorge's greenbul	Eurillas ansorgei	African tropical rainforest
