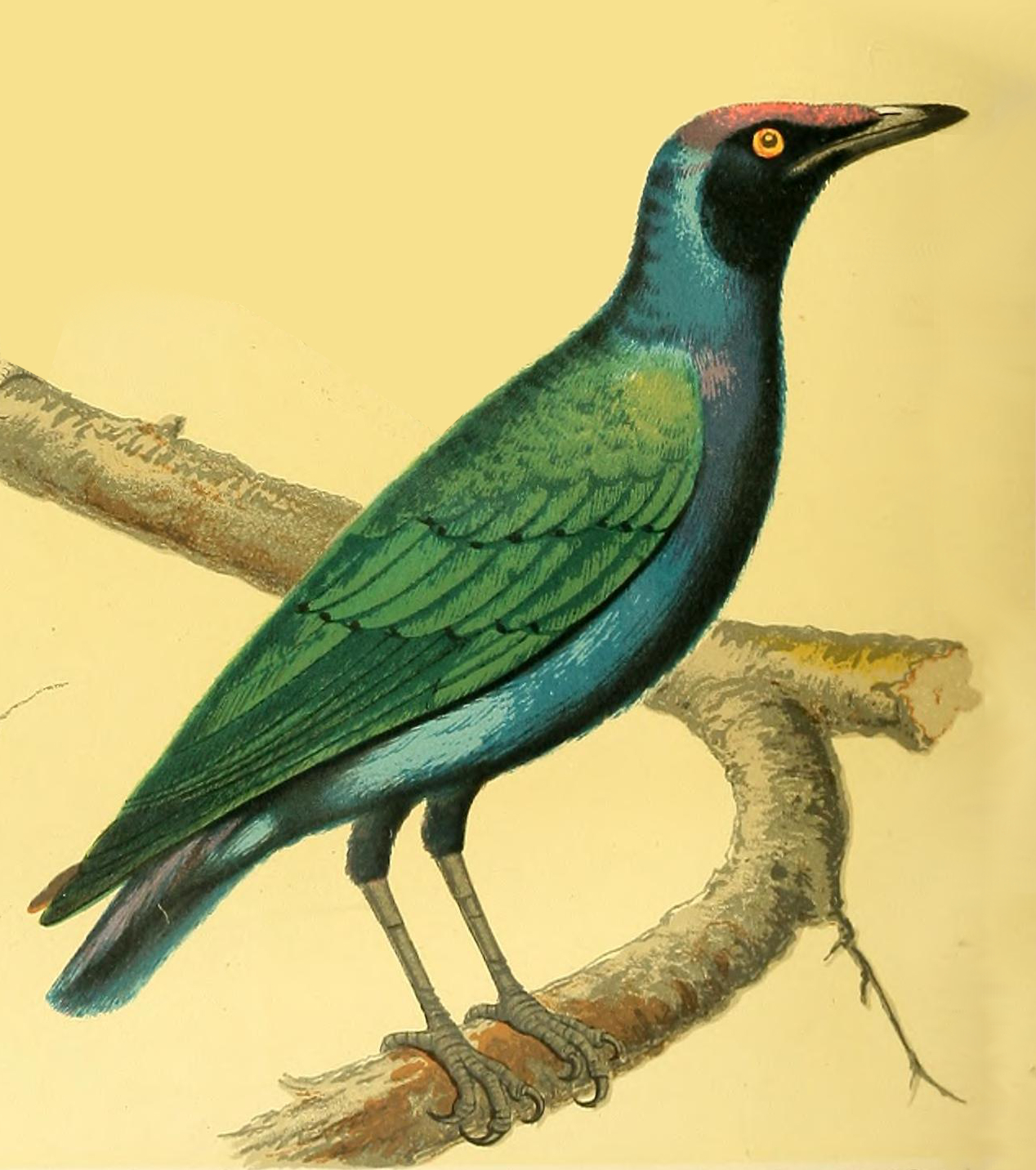
- Purple-headed starling (Hylopsar purpureiceps)

Scientific classification
- Kingdom: Animalia
- Phylum: Chordata
- Class: Aves
- Order: Passeriformes
- Family: Sturnidae
- Genus: Hylopsar von Boetticher, 1940

Type species
- Lamprocolius purpureiceps Verreaux, J & Verreaux, É, 1851

= Hylopsar =

Genus of birds

Hylopsar is a genus of African birds in the family Sturnidae.

== Species ==
Image	Scientific name	Common name	Distribution
	Hylopsar purpureiceps	Purple-headed starling	Angola, Benin, Cameroon, Central African Republic, Republic of the Congo, Democratic Republic of the Congo, Ivory Coast, Equatorial Guinea, Gabon, Guinea, Nigeria, and Uganda.
	Hylopsar cupreocauda	Copper-tailed starling	Ivory Coast, Ghana, Guinea, Liberia, and Sierra Leone
