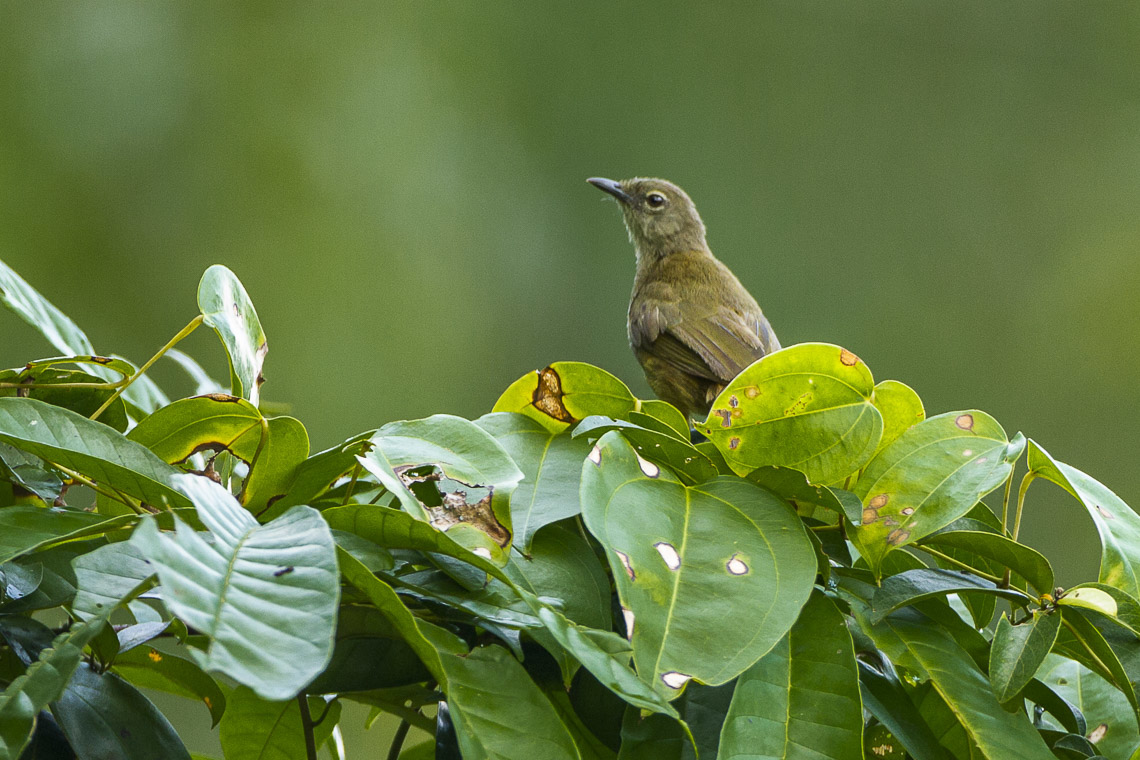

Conservation status
- Least Concern (IUCN 3.1)

Scientific classification
- Kingdom: Animalia
- Phylum: Chordata
- Class: Aves
- Order: Passeriformes
- Family: Pycnonotidae
- Genus: Eurillas
- Species: E. gracilis

Binomial name
- Eurillas gracilis (Cabanis, 1880)
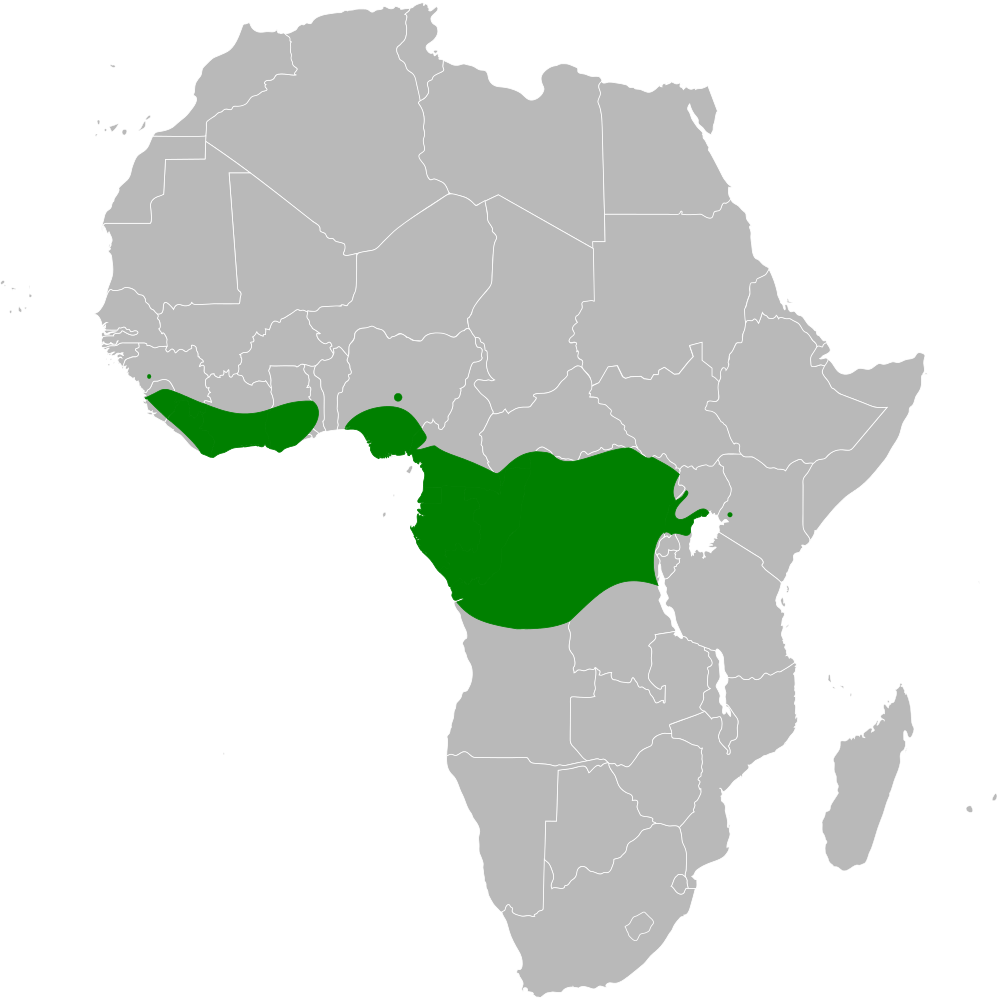

Synonyms
- Andropadus gracilis; Pycnonotus gracilis

= Little grey greenbul =

Species of bird

The little grey greenbul (Eurillas gracilis) is a species of the bulbul family of passerine birds. It is widely distributed across the African tropical rainforest. Its natural habitats are subtropical or tropical moist lowland forests and subtropical or tropical swamps.

== Taxonomy and systematics ==
The little grey greenbul was originally described in the genus Andropadus and was re-classified to the genus Eurillas in 2010. Alternatively, some authorities classify the little greenbul in the genus Pycnonotus. Alternate names for the little grey greenbul include the grey greenbul and little grey bulbul.

=== Subspecies ===
Three subspecies are recognized. Some authorities have also considered Ansorge's greenbul as a subspecies of the little grey greenbul:

- Gold Coast little grey greenbul (E. g. extrema) - (Hartert, 1922): Found from Sierra Leone to south-western Nigeria
- E. g. gracilis - Cabanis, 1880: Found south-eastern Nigeria to central Democratic Republic of Congo and northern Angola
- E. g. ugandae - (van Someren, 1915): Found from eastern Democratic Republic of Congo to central Uganda and western Kenya
