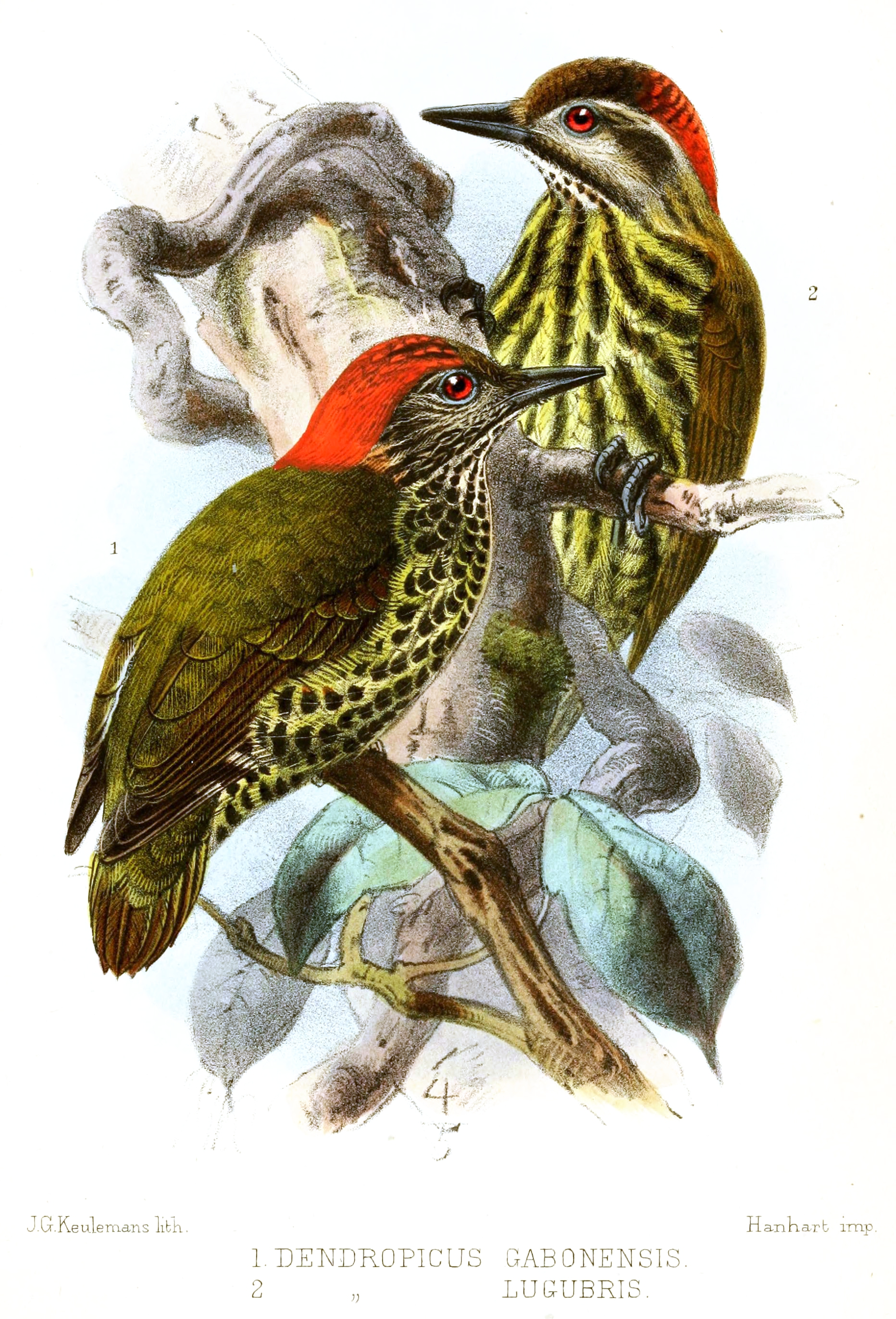
- Illustration (left) with melancholy woodpecker

Conservation status
- Least Concern (IUCN 3.1)

Scientific classification
- Kingdom: Animalia
- Phylum: Chordata
- Class: Aves
- Order: Piciformes
- Family: Picidae
- Genus: Dendropicos
- Species: D. gabonensis

Binomial name
- Dendropicos gabonensis (Verreaux & Verreaux, 1851)

Synonyms
- Chloropicus gabonensis

= Gabon woodpecker =

Species of bird

The Gabon woodpecker (Dendropicos gabonensis) is a species of small woodpecker in the family Picidae which occurs in western central Africa.

== Description ==
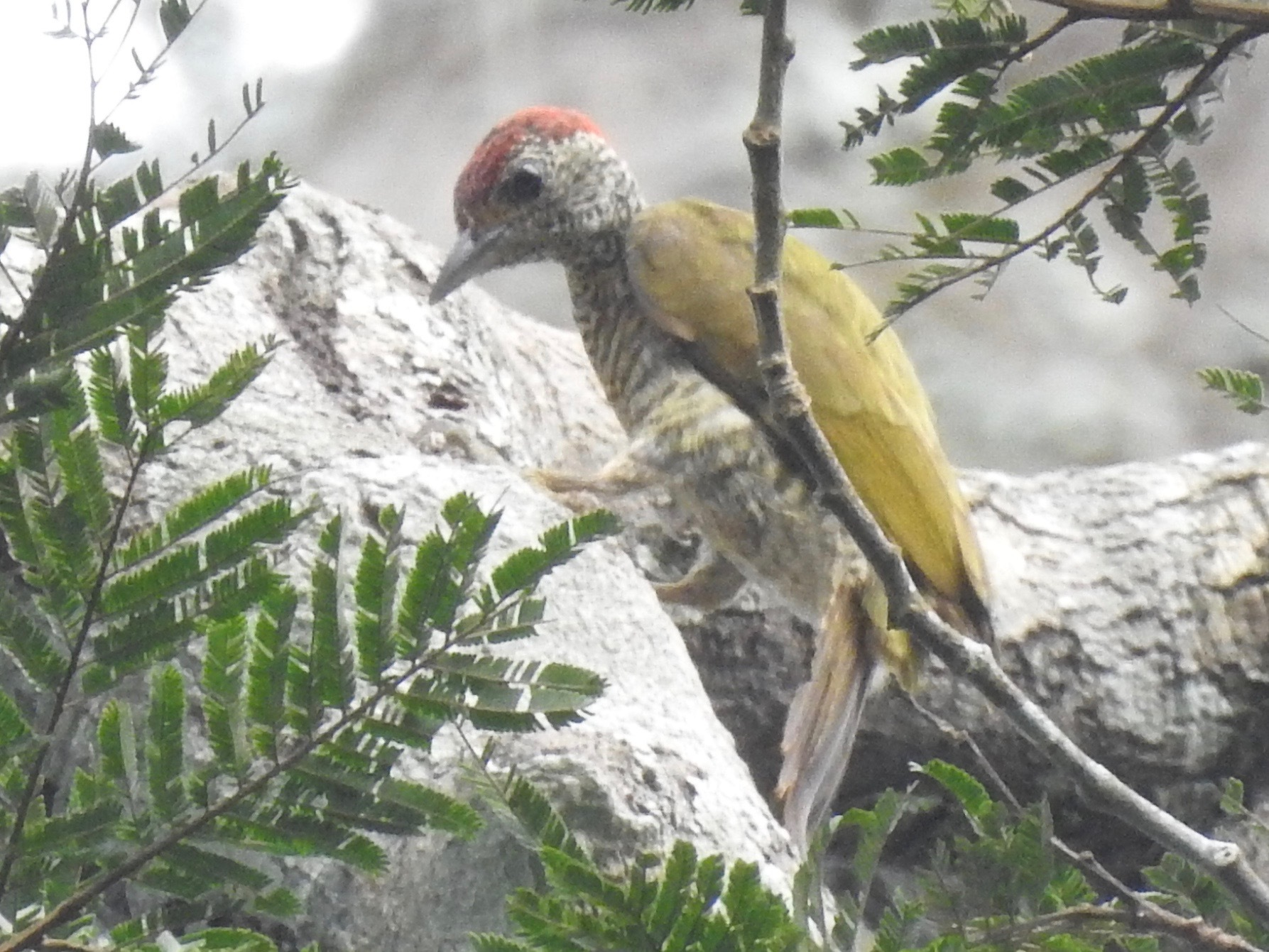
Live bird

The Gabon woodpecker is a small woodpecker with a short bill which is quite broad at the base. It has plain green upperparts, a plain dark tail and heavily spotted underparts with a yellowish background colour. The crown is brownish but the males have a red hindcrown and nape, as well as an indistinct, narrow moustachial. The adult females lack red on the head, however both sexes of juveniles have red on the centre of the crown. The subspecies D.g. reichenowihas a more distinct moustachial stripe, broader underpart streaking and a lesser extent of red on the adult male's head than the nominate subspecies. They are 16–17 cm in length and weigh 24–30 g.

== Distribution, subspecies and taxonomy ==
There are two currently recognised subspecies, they and their distribution are:

- Dendropicos gabonensis reichenowi Sjöstedt, 1893: Southern Nigeria to south-western Cameroon.
- Dendropicos gabonensis gabonensis (J. P. Verreaux & J. B. É. Verreaux, 1851): Southern Cameroon. except the south-west, and south-western Central African Republic south to southern Republic of Congo, and east across northern and central Democratic Republic of Congo, east to the western slopes of the Ruwenzori Mountains and south to western Kasai to extreme western Uganda; reports from Cabinda the exclave of Angola are considered dubious.

The melancholy woodpecker Dendropicos lugubris which breeds from Sierra Leone east to Nigeria, is sometimes considered a subspecies of Gabon woodpecker and D.g. reichenowi is intermediate in appearance between lugubris and gabonensis.

== Habitat ==
The Gabon woodpecker occurs in forest edge, tall secondary growth and the wooded edges of farmland, normally lower than 1400m above sea level. It avoids dense forest and savannas.

== Habits ==
The Gabon woodpecker breeds in September and October in the west and June in Uganda. It forages by probing into and gleaning from bark, as well as pecking at and prising off pieces of bark and soft wood.
