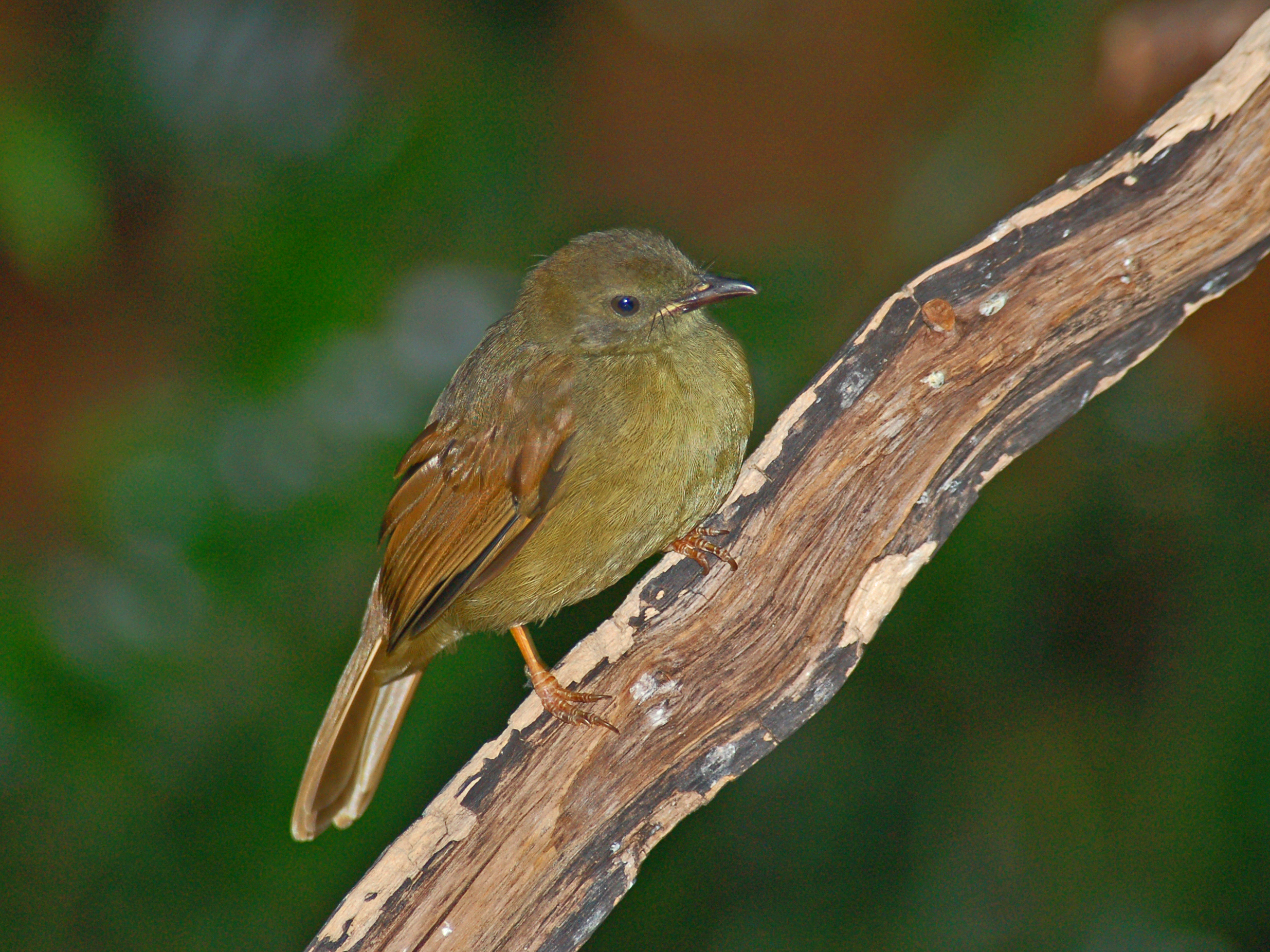
- at Bird Kingdom, Niagara Falls

Conservation status
- Least Concern (IUCN 3.1)

Scientific classification
- Kingdom: Animalia
- Phylum: Chordata
- Class: Aves
- Order: Passeriformes
- Family: Pycnonotidae
- Genus: Eurillas
- Species: E. virens

Binomial name
- Eurillas virens (Cassin, 1857)
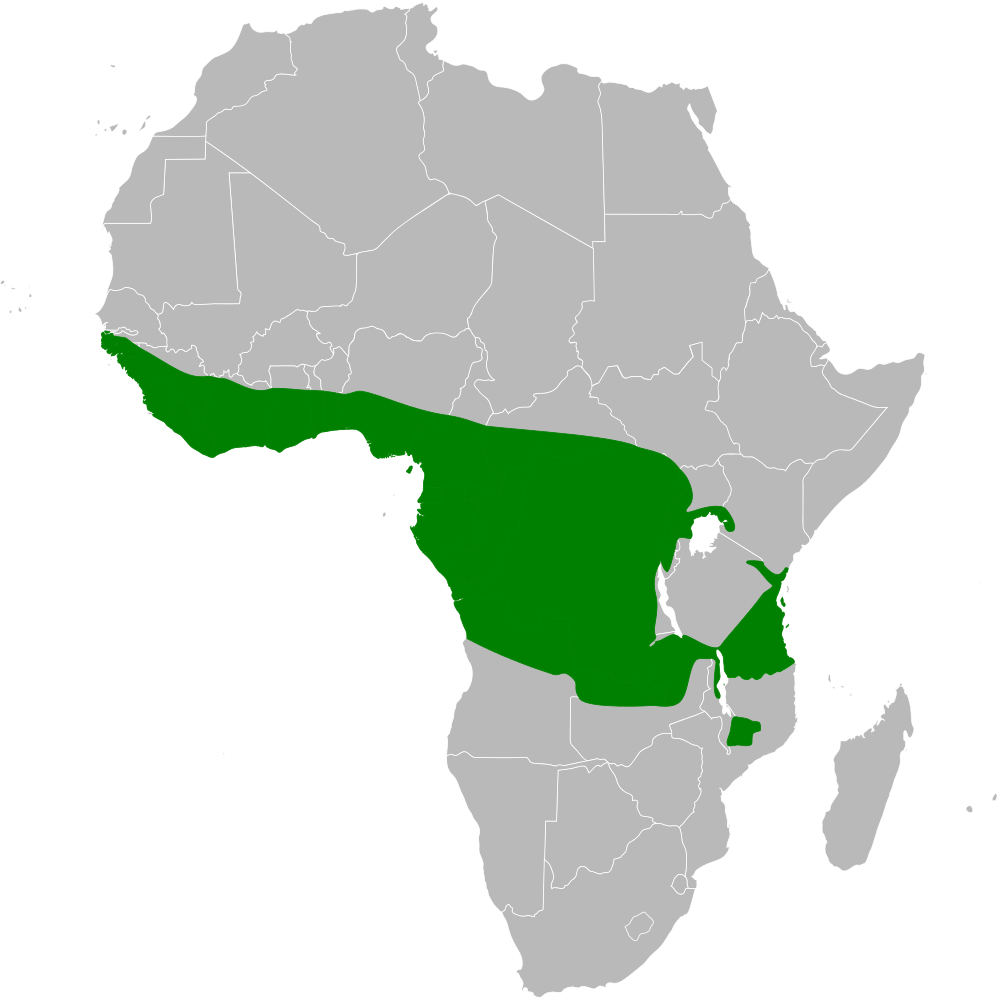

Synonyms
- Andropadus hallae; Andropadus virens; Pycnonotus virens

= Little greenbul =

Species of bird

The little greenbul (Eurillas virens) is a species of the bulbul family of passerine birds. It is found in many parts of sub-Saharan Africa.

== Taxonomy and systematics ==
The little greenbul was originally described in the genus Andropadus and was re-classified to the genus Eurillas in 2010. Alternatively, some authorities classify the little greenbul in the genus Pycnonotus.

=== Subspecies ===
Five subspecies are recognized:

- E. v. amadoni - (Dickerman, 1997): Found on Bioko
- Upper Guinea little greenbul (E. v. erythroptera) - (Hartlaub, 1858): Found from Gambia to southern Nigeria
- E. v. virens - (Cassin, 1857): Found from western Cameroon to southern Sudan, western Kenya, southern Democratic Republic of Congo and northern Angola
- E. v. zanzibarica - Pakenham, 1935: Found on Zanzibar
- E. v. zombensis - (Shelley, 1894): Found from south-eastern Democratic Republic of Congo and northern Zambia to south-eastern Kenya and northern Mozambique. Includes Hall's greenbul (Eurillas virens [hallae]), named after the British ornithologist Pat Hall and which is only known from a single specimen taken in the Democratic Republic of the Congo. Hall's greenbul may be a melanistic form of E. v. zombensis.

== Description ==
The little greenbul is a small bird reaching a total length of about 187 mm, with wings of about 80 mm and tail of about 77 mm. The upper tail and wings are brown, while breast and flanks are pale grey-greenish (hence the Latin name virens of this species, meaning "green"). The bill is brown, the iris is brown and the feet are light yellow-brown.

== Distribution and habitat ==
The little greenbul is found in western, central and eastern Africa.

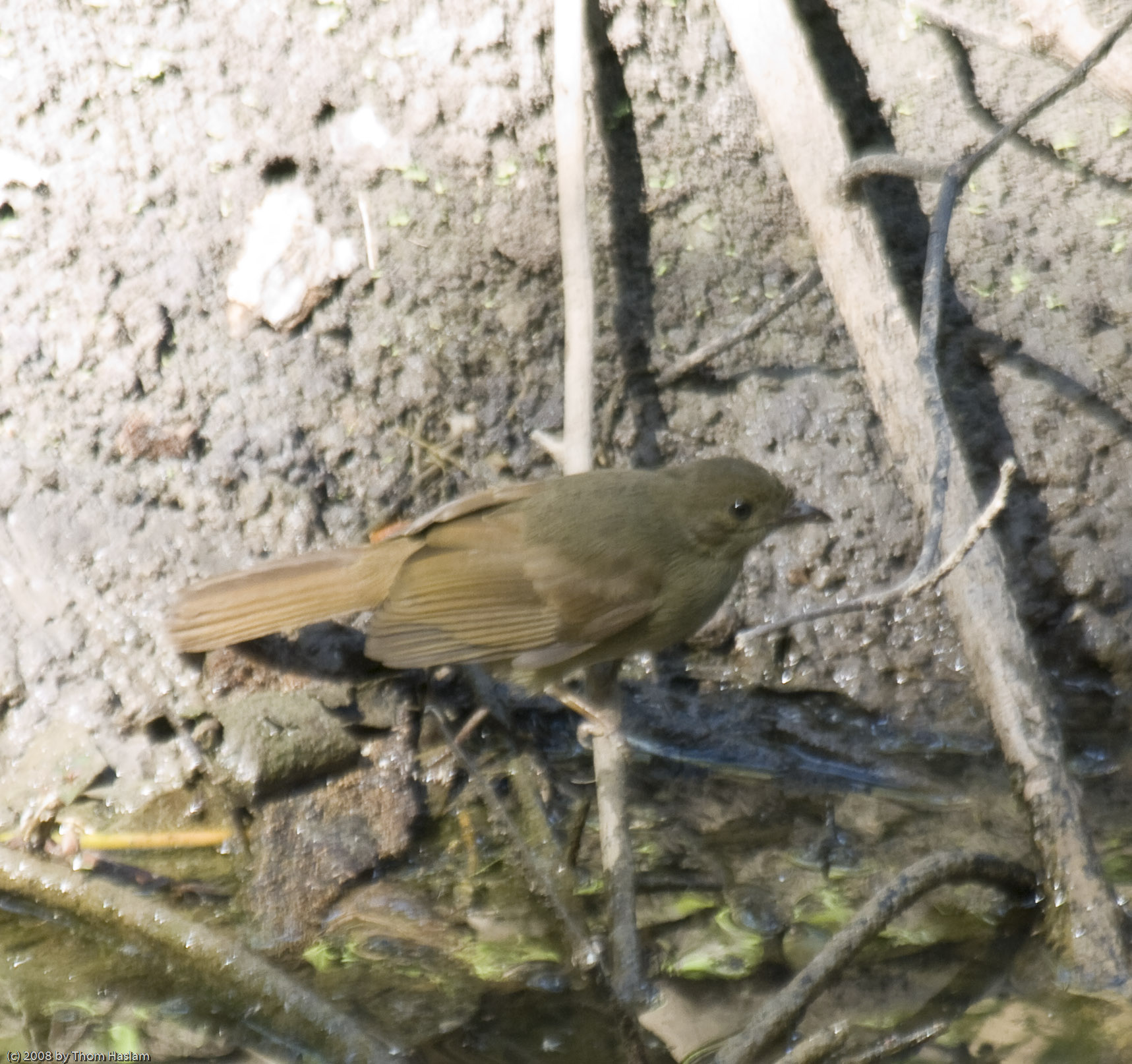
Eurillas virens photographed in Gambia

Its natural habitats are subtropical or tropical dry forests, subtropical or tropical moist lowland forests, and moist savanna.

== Behaviour and ecology ==
The little greenbul was the subject of a study regarding the impact of ecotones on biodiversity.
