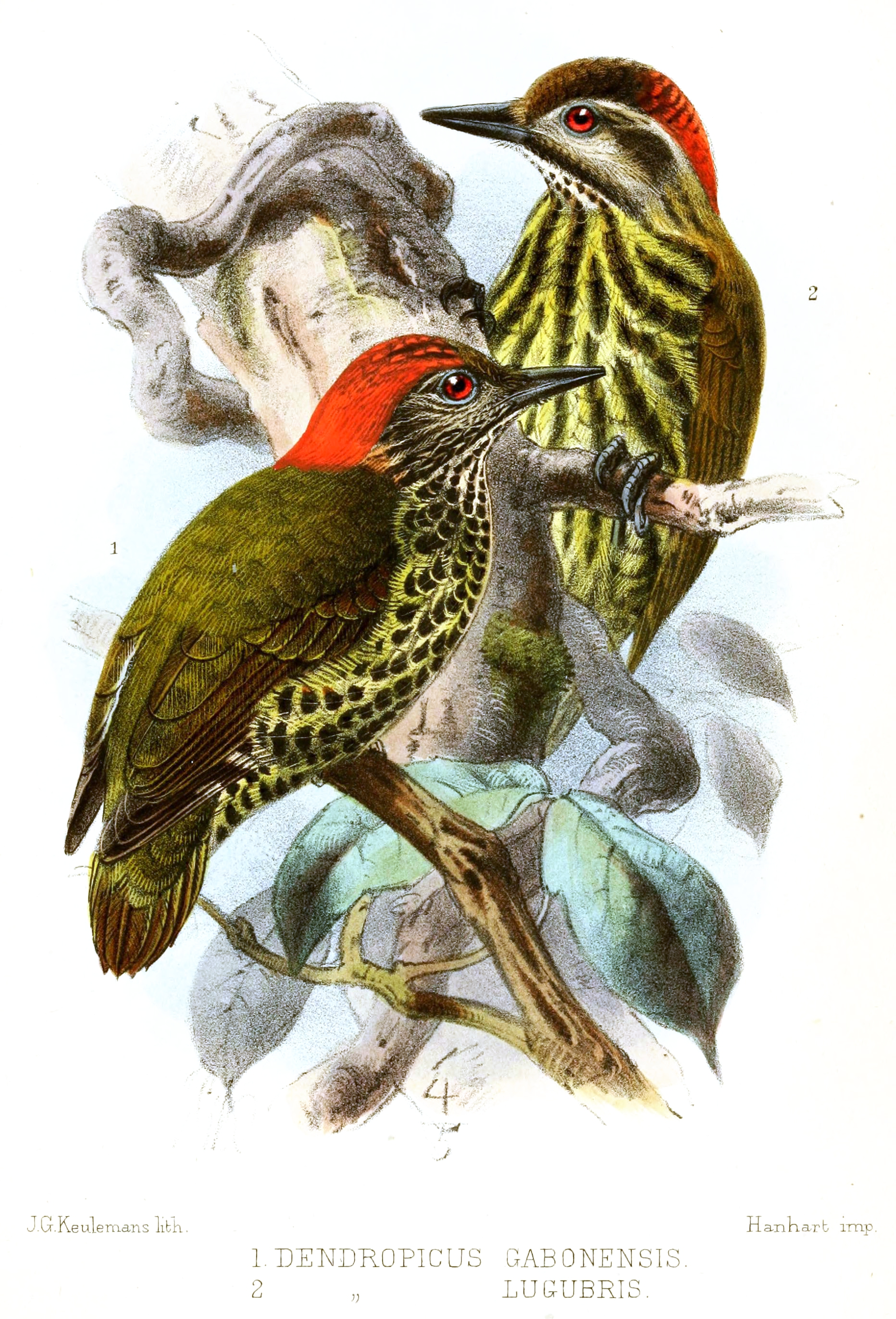
- Illustration (right) with Gabon woodpecker (in front)

Conservation status
- Least Concern (IUCN 3.1)

Scientific classification
- Kingdom: Animalia
- Phylum: Chordata
- Class: Aves
- Order: Piciformes
- Family: Picidae
- Genus: Dendropicos
- Species: D. lugubris

Binomial name
- Dendropicos lugubris Hartlaub, 1857

Synonyms
- Dendropicos gabonensis lugubris; Chloropicus lugubris

= Melancholy woodpecker =

Species of bird

The melancholy woodpecker (Dendropicos lugubris) is a species of woodpecker. It is found in West Africa from Sierra Leone east to Nigeria, living in forests, forest edges, clearings and woodlands. It is sometimes considered to be a subspecies of the Gabon woodpecker. The International Union for Conservation of Nature has assessed it as a least-concern species.

== Taxonomy ==
This species was formally described by the German ornithologist Gustav Hartlaub in 1857. The species is monotypic. It was sometimes considered conspecific with the Gabon woodpecker, Dendropicos gabonensis, because D. gabonensis reichenowi is intermediate between the two species.

== Description ==
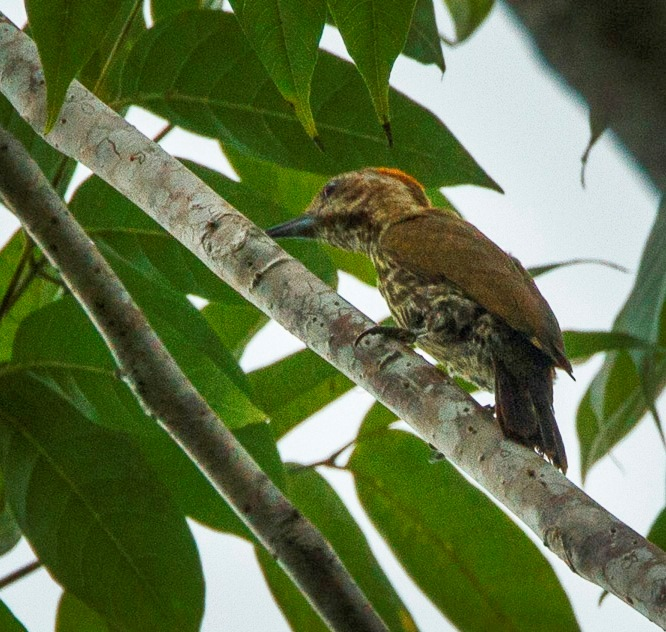
In Kakum National Park, Ghana

The melancholy woodpecker is 17–18 cm (6.7–7.1 in) long. The crown is olive-brown, and the nape is red in the male and blackish in the female. The face is white and has an olive-brown malar, dusky ear coverts and a white supercilium. The chin and throat are white and often have dark streaks or spots. The upperparts are bronzy-green. The flight feathers are brown, with greenish-bronze edges. The tail is black above and grey-black below. The underparts are greenish-yellow, with broad brown streaks. The beak is greyish, the legs are olive or grey, and the iris is chesnut. The juvenile bird is duller, and its upperparts do not have a bronze tone.

== Distribution and habitat ==
This woodpecker is found in the Upper Guinean forests of West Africa, in Cameroon, Ivory Coast, Ghana, Guinea, Guinea-Bissau, Liberia, Nigeria, Sierra Leone and Togo. Its habitat is open forest, forest edges, clearings, secondary forest and woodlands, up to 1,200 m (3,900 ft) in elevation. It is also found in swamps, plantations and gardens.

== Behaviour ==
The melancholy woodpecker eats insects in the canopy. It forages in families and joins mixed-species foraging flocks. It sometimes drums quietly and stridently. Its calls include a tinny trill, a series of rrek and rrak notes, b-ddddddd-d-it, br-r-r-r-r-r-r and zh-dzeeeep. It calls pit notes in disputes. Breeding may occur from December to March.

== Status ==
The species has a large range and stable population, so the IUCN has assessed it as a least-concern species.
