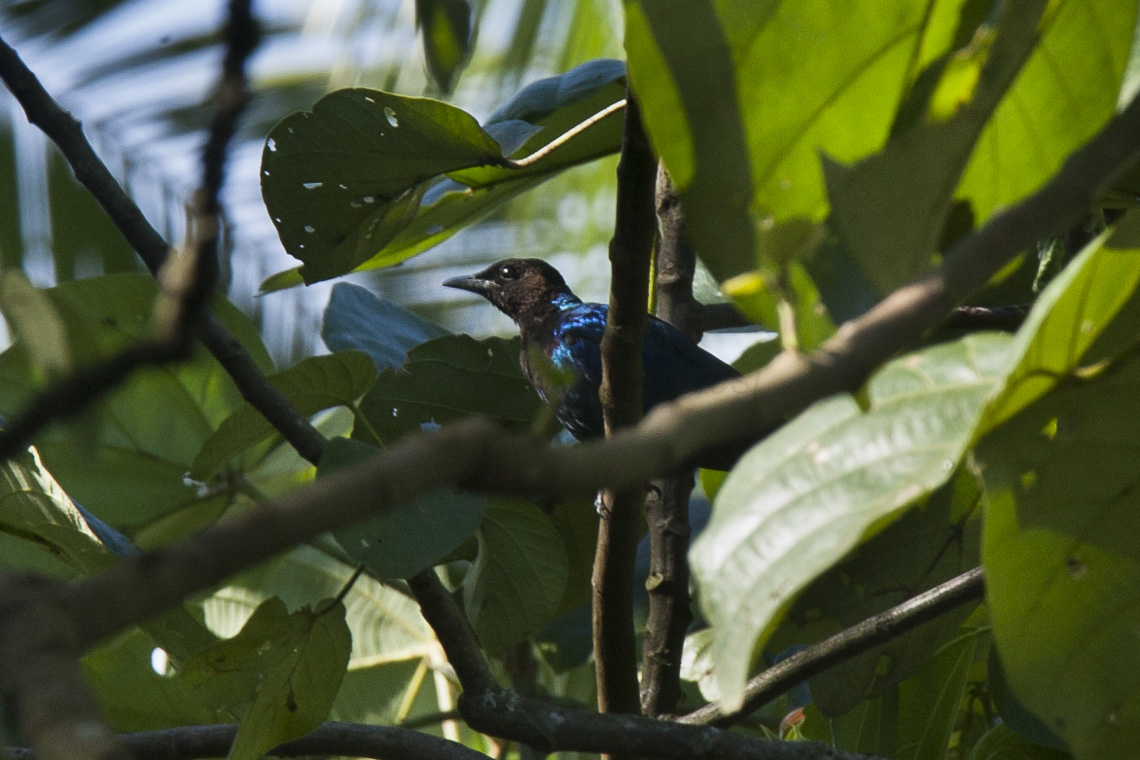

Conservation status
- Least Concern (IUCN 3.1)

Scientific classification
- Kingdom: Animalia
- Phylum: Chordata
- Class: Aves
- Order: Passeriformes
- Family: Sturnidae
- Genus: Hylopsar
- Species: H. purpureiceps

Binomial name
- Hylopsar purpureiceps (Verreaux & Verreaux, 1851)

Synonyms
- Lamprotornis purpureiceps

= Purple-headed starling =

Species of bird

The purple-headed starling (Hylopsar purpureiceps), also known as the purple-headed glossy-starling, is a species of starling in the family Sturnidae.

== Distribution and habitat ==
It is found in Angola, Benin, Cameroon, Central African Republic, Republic of the Congo, Democratic Republic of the Congo, Ivory Coast, Equatorial Guinea, Gabon, Guinea, Malawi, Nigeria, and Uganda.
