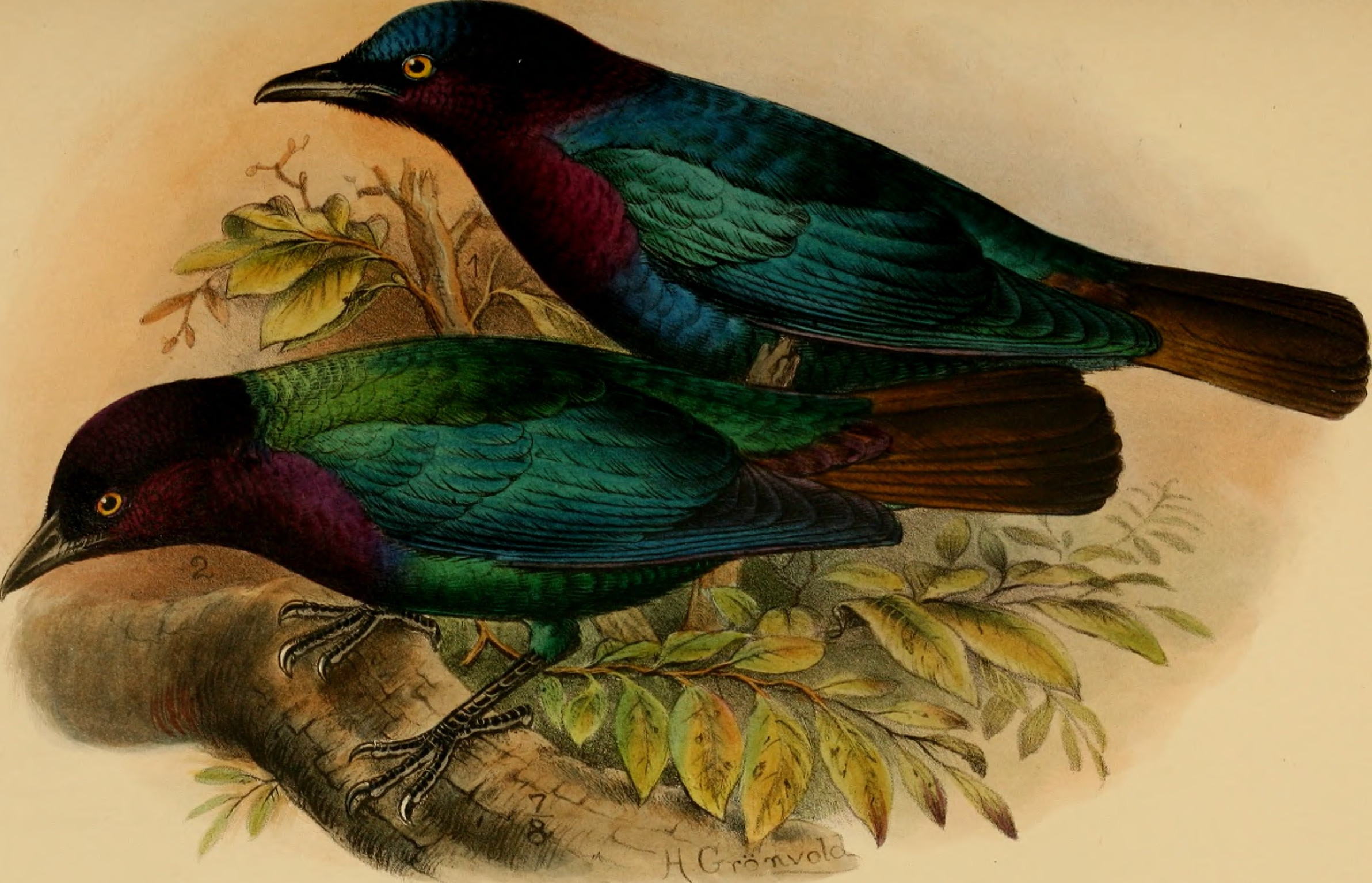

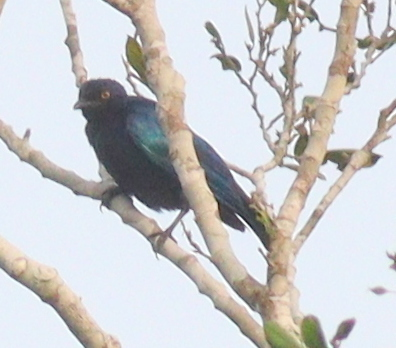

Conservation status
- Near Threatened (IUCN 3.1)

Scientific classification
- Kingdom: Animalia
- Phylum: Chordata
- Class: Aves
- Order: Passeriformes
- Family: Sturnidae
- Genus: Hylopsar
- Species: H. cupreocauda

Binomial name
- Hylopsar cupreocauda (Hartlaub, 1857)

Synonyms
- Lamprotornis cupreocauda

= Copper-tailed starling =

Species of bird

The copper-tailed starling or copper-tailed glossy-starling (Hylopsar cupreocauda) is a species of starling in the family Sturnidae. It is found in Ivory Coast, Ghana, Guinea, Liberia, and Sierra Leone. Its natural habitat is tropical moist lowland forests. It is threatened by habitat loss.
