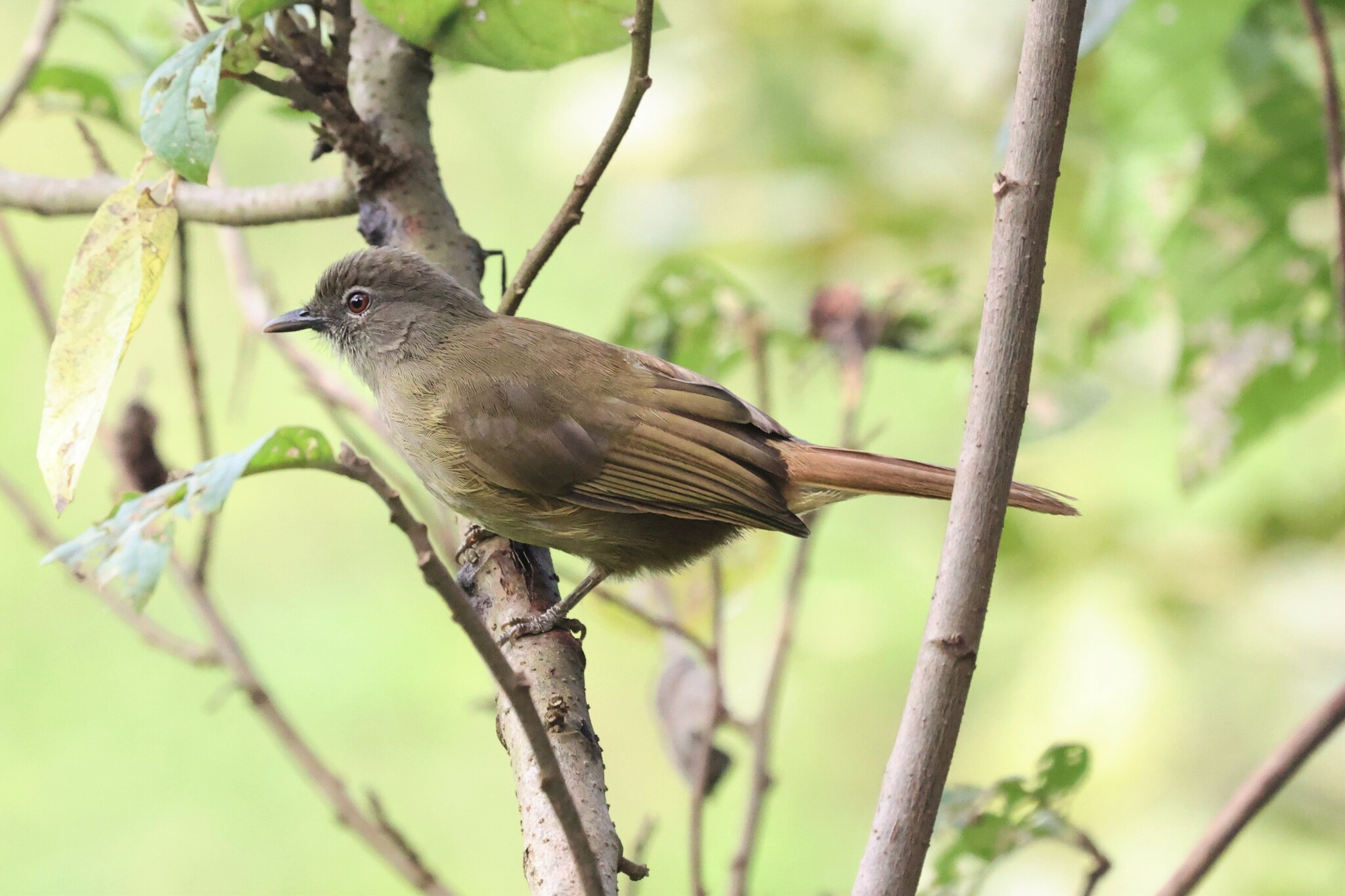

Conservation status
- Least Concern (IUCN 3.1)

Scientific classification
- Kingdom: Animalia
- Phylum: Chordata
- Class: Aves
- Order: Passeriformes
- Family: Pycnonotidae
- Genus: Eurillas
- Species: E. curvirostris

Binomial name
- Eurillas curvirostris (Cassin, 1859)
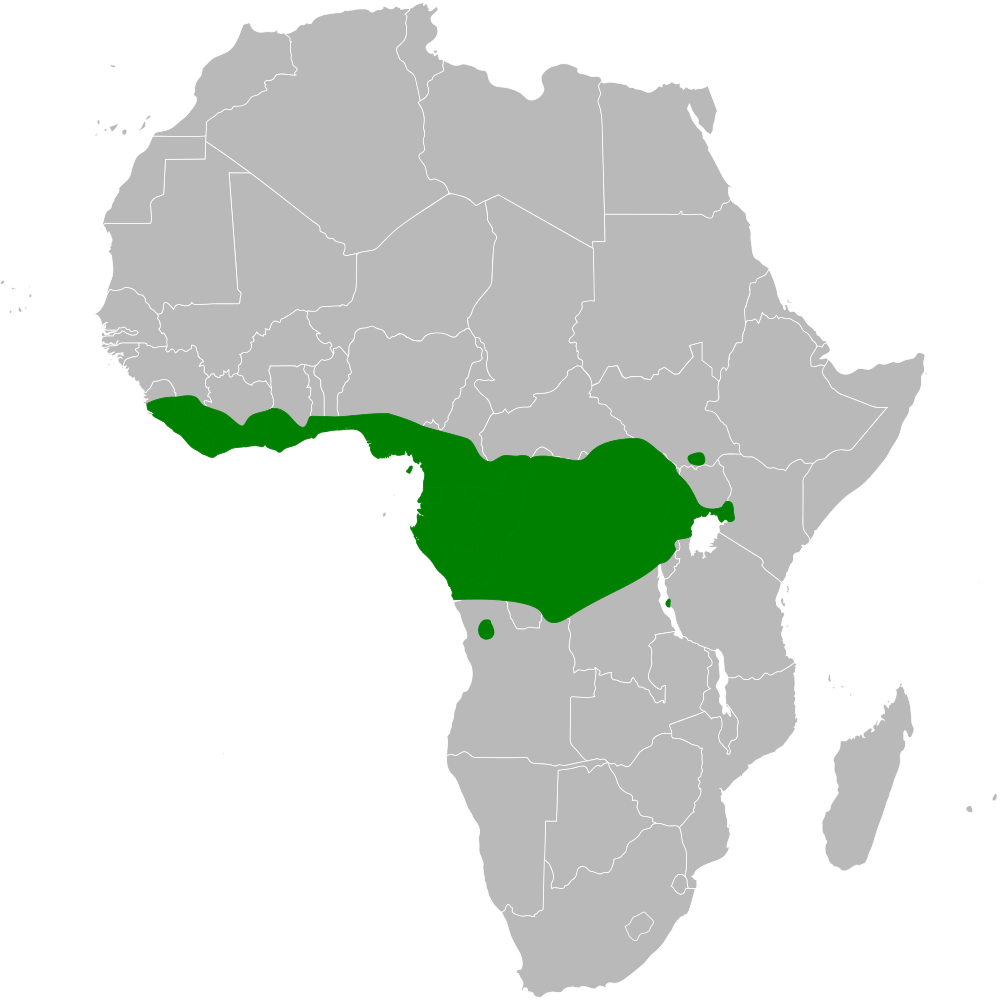

Synonyms
- Andropadus alexandri; Andropadus curvirostris; Pycnonotus curvirostris

= Plain greenbul =

Species of bird

The plain greenbul (Eurillas curvirostris) is a species of the bulbul family of passerine birds. It is mainly native to the Guineo-Congolian region.

Its natural habitats are subtropical or tropical dry forest, subtropical or tropical moist lowland forest, and subtropical or tropical moist montane forest.

== Taxonomy and systematics ==
The plain greenbul was originally described in the genus Andropadus and was re-classified to the genus Eurillas in 2010. Alternatively, some authorities classify the plain greenbul in the genus Pycnonotus.

=== Subspecies ===
Two subspecies are recognized:

- E. c. curvirostris - (Cassin, 1859): Found from central Ghana to western Kenya, southern Democratic Republic of Congo and northern Angola
- E. c. leonina - (Bates, 1930): Found from Sierra Leone to central Ghana
