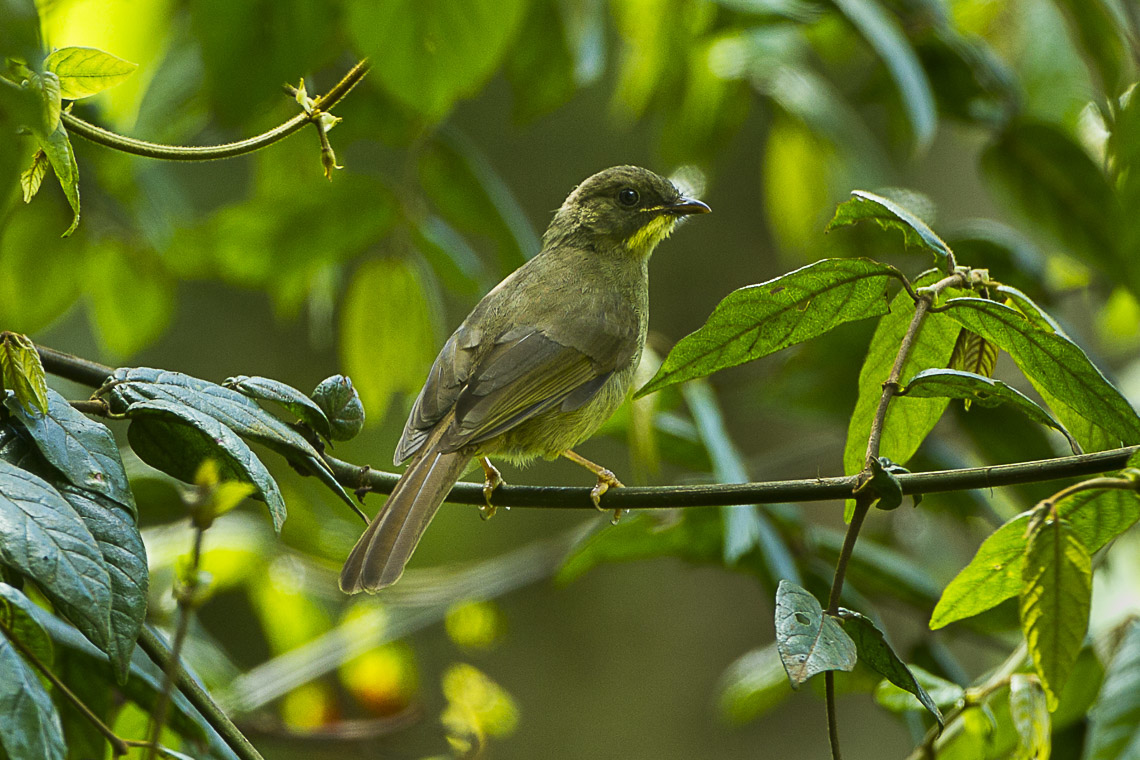

Conservation status
- Least Concern (IUCN 3.1)

Scientific classification
- Kingdom: Animalia
- Phylum: Chordata
- Class: Aves
- Order: Passeriformes
- Family: Pycnonotidae
- Genus: Eurillas
- Species: E. latirostris

Binomial name
- Eurillas latirostris (Strickland, 1844)
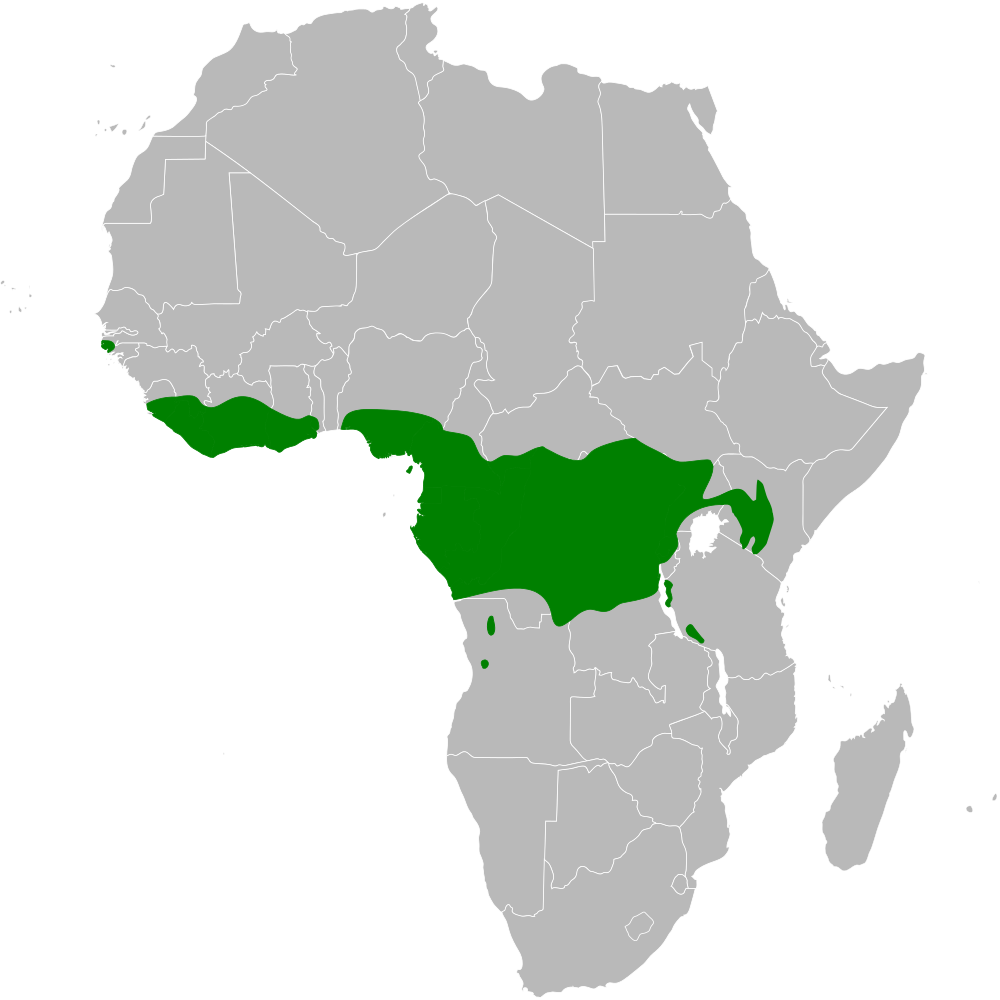

Synonyms
- Andropadus latirostris; Pycnonotus latirostris

= Yellow-whiskered greenbul =

Species of bird

The yellow-whiskered greenbul or yellow-whiskered bulbul (Eurillas latirostris) is a species of the bulbul family of passerine birds. It is found in western and central Africa.

Its natural habitats are subtropical or tropical dry forest, subtropical or tropical moist lowland forest, subtropical or tropical moist montane forest, and subtropical or tropical moist shrubland.

== Taxonomy and systematics ==
The yellow-whiskered greenbul was originally described in the genus Andropadus and was re-classified to the genus Eurillas in 2010. Alternatively, some authorities classify the yellow-whiskered greenbul in the genus Pycnonotus.

=== Subspecies ===
Three subspecies are recognized:

- E. l. australis - (Moreau, 1941): Found on the Ufipa Plateau (Tanzania)
- Upper Guinea yellow-whiskered greenbul (E. l. congener) - (Reichenow, 1897): Found from Senegal to south-western Nigeria
- Uganda yellow-whiskered greenbul (E. l. latirostris) - (Strickland, 1844): Nominate species is also named the Kilimanjaro sombre greenbul. Found from south-eastern Nigeria to southern Sudan, western Kenya, western Tanzania, south-central Democratic Republic of Congo and northern Angola
