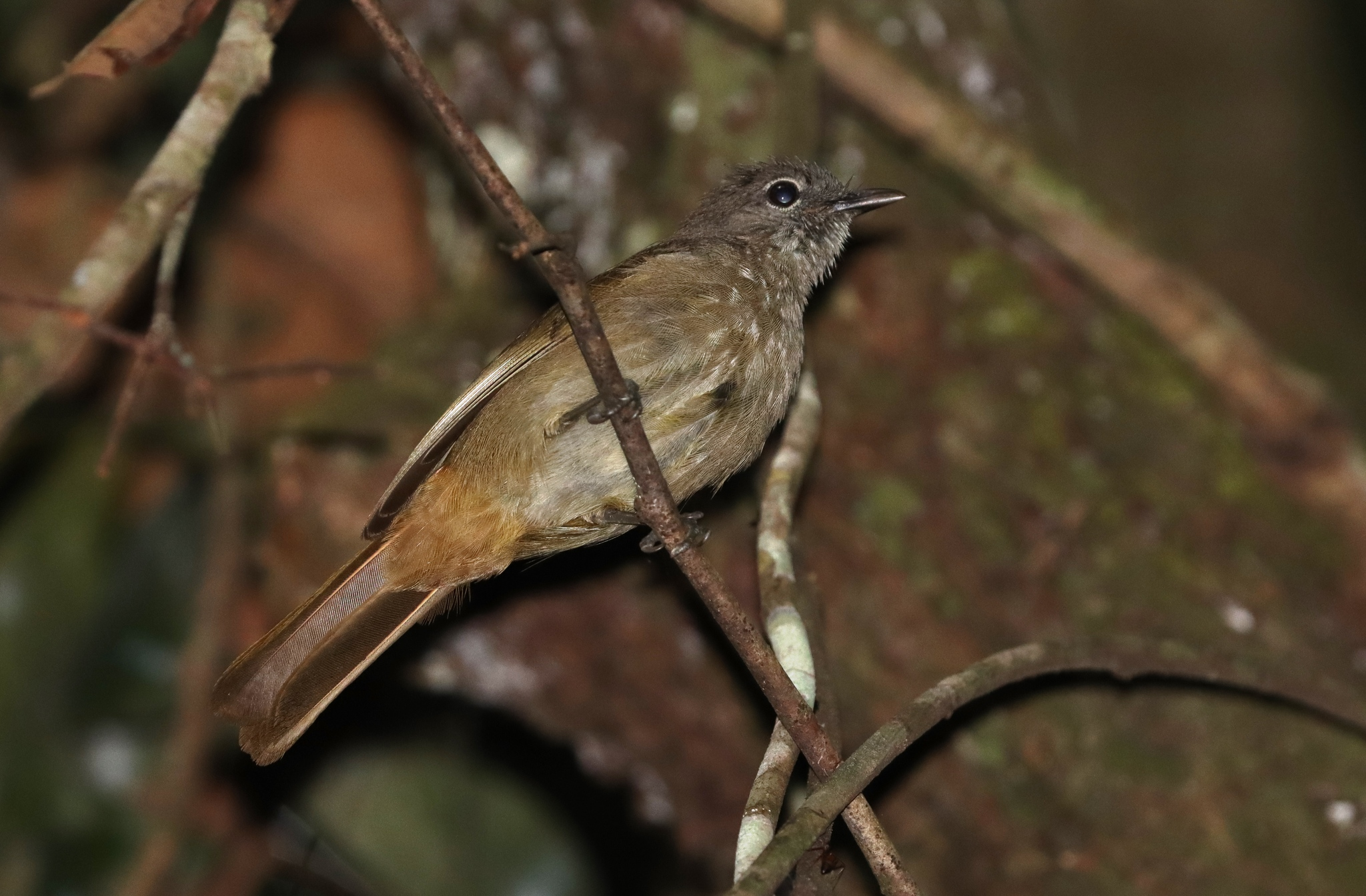
- subspecies ansorgei

Conservation status
- Least Concern (IUCN 3.1)

Scientific classification
- Kingdom: Animalia
- Phylum: Chordata
- Class: Aves
- Order: Passeriformes
- Family: Pycnonotidae
- Genus: Eurillas
- Species: E. ansorgei

Binomial name
- Eurillas ansorgei (Hartert, 1907)
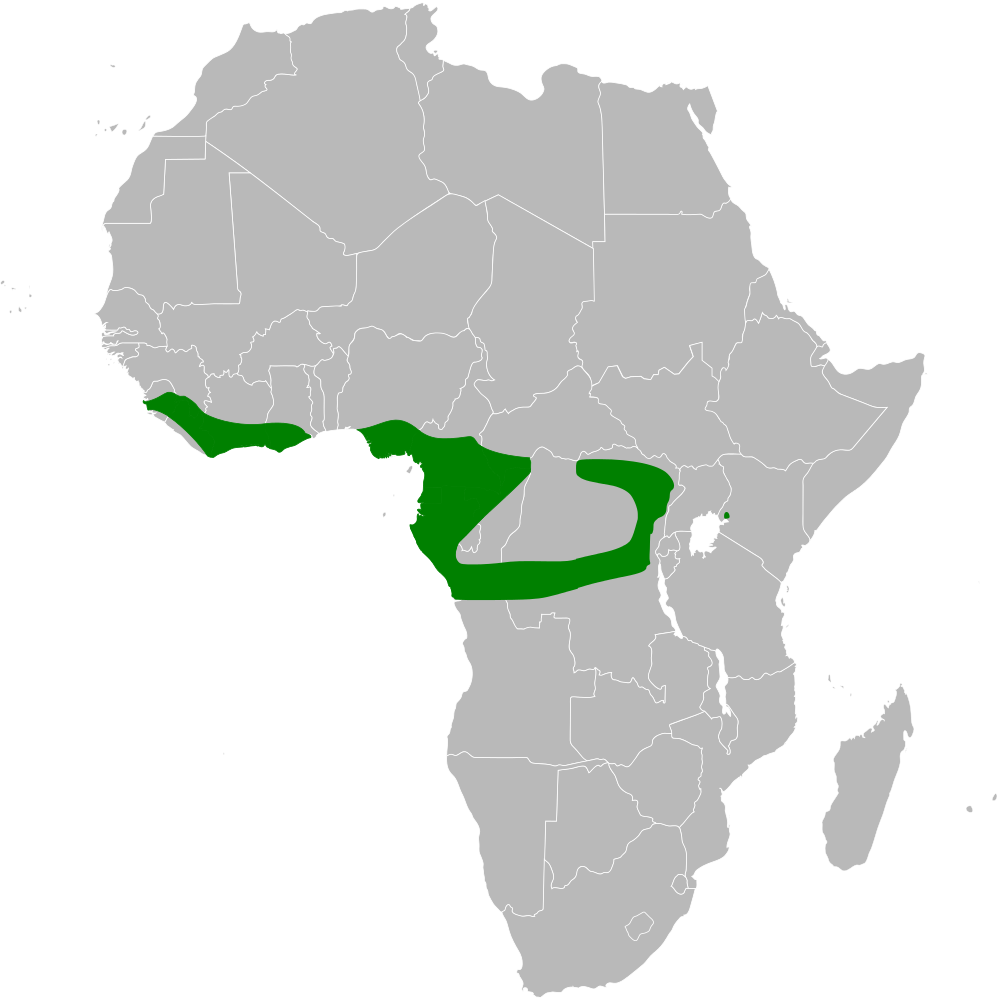

Synonyms
- Andropadus ansorgei; Andropadus gracilis ansorgei; Pycnonotus ansorgei

= Ansorge's greenbul =

Species of bird

Ansorge's greenbul (Eurillas ansorgei) or Ansorge's bulbul, is a species of the bulbul family of passerine birds. It is found in western and central Africa. Its natural habitat is subtropical or tropical moist lowland forests.

== Taxonomy and systematics ==
Ansorge's greenbul was originally described in the genus Andropadus and was re-classified to the genus Eurillas in 2010. Alternatively, some authorities classify Ansorge's greenbul in the genus Pycnonotus. Some authorities have considered Ansorge's greenbul as a subspecies of the little grey greenbul. The common name and scientific name commemorate the British explorer and collector William John Ansorge who collected natural history specimens in Africa.

=== Subspecies ===
Two subspecies are recognized:

- Ansorge's little grey greenbul (E. a. ansorgei) - (Hartert, 1907): Found from western Guinea to south-western Uganda and eastern Democratic Republic of Congo
- Kavirondo little grey greenbul (E. a. kavirondensis) - (van Someren, 1920): Originally described as a separate species. Found in western Kenya
