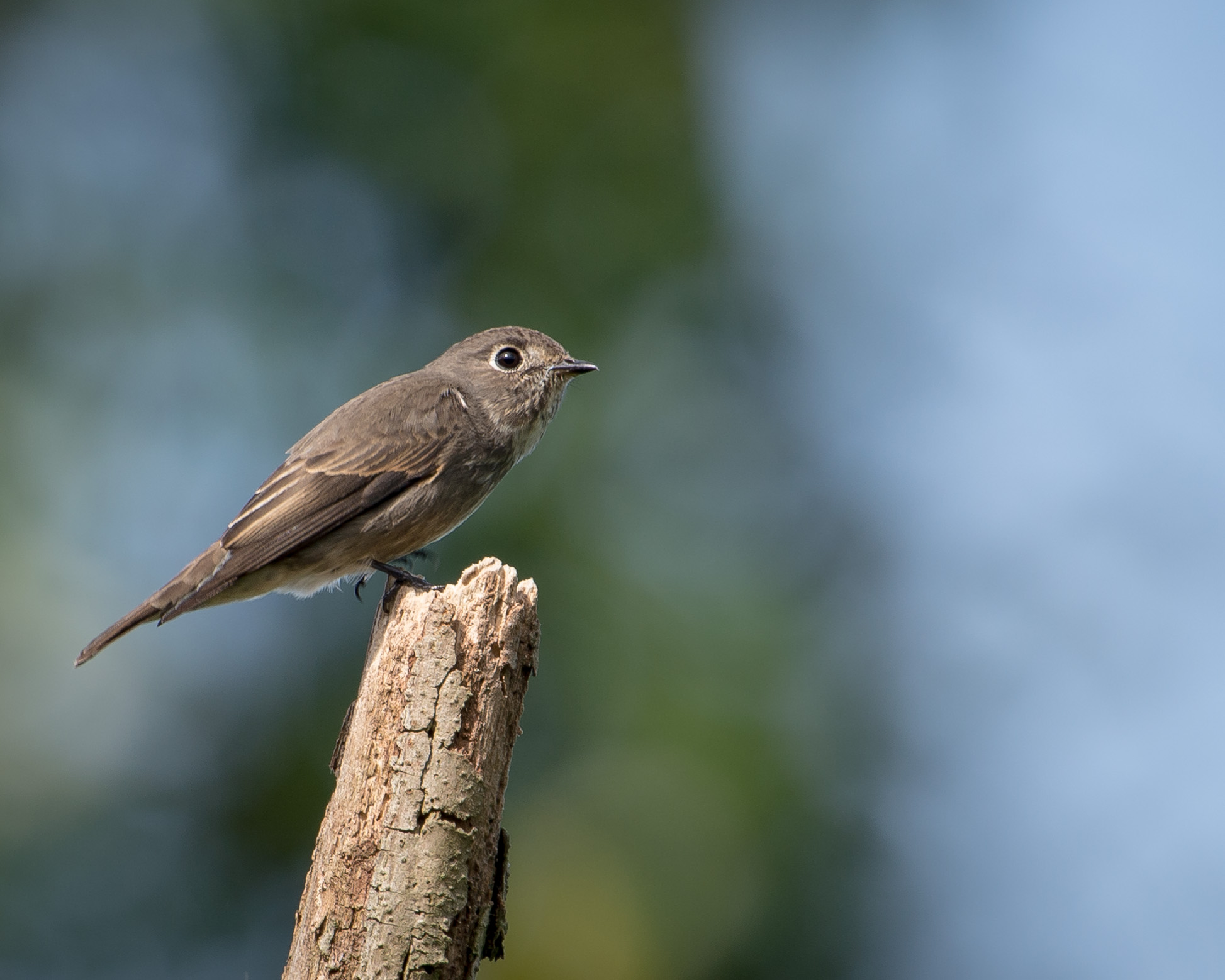
- In Kaeng Krachan NP, Petchburi, Thailand

Conservation status
- Least Concern (IUCN 3.1)

Scientific classification
- Kingdom: Animalia
- Phylum: Chordata
- Class: Aves
- Order: Passeriformes
- Family: Muscicapidae
- Genus: Muscicapa
- Species: M. sibirica

Binomial name
- Muscicapa sibirica Gmelin, JF, 1789

= Dark-sided flycatcher =

Species of bird

The dark-sided flycatcher (Muscicapa sibirica) is a small passerine bird belonging to the genus Muscicapa in the Old World flycatcher family Muscicapidae. It has a wide breeding distribution in the East Palearctic with northern birds migrating south for the winter. It is also known as the Siberian flycatcher or sooty flycatcher, the latter name is also used for the sooty flycatcher (Artomyias infuscata) of Africa.

== Taxonomy ==
The dark-sided flycatcher was formally described in 1789 by the German naturalist Johann Friedrich Gmelin in his revised and expanded edition of Carl Linnaeus's Systema Naturae. He placed it with the flycatchers in the genus Muscicapa and coined the binomial name Muscicapa sibirica. Gmelin based his account on the "Dunn flycatcher" that had been described in 1783 by the English ornithologist John Latham in his multi-volume work A General Synopsis of Birds. Latham reported that the bird was found around Lake Baikal in southern Siberia.

Four subspecies are recognised:

- M. s. sibirica Gmelin, JF, 1789 – central, south Siberia to Korea and Japan
- M. s. gulmergi (Baker, ECS, 1923) – northeast Afghanistan and northwest Himalayas
- M. s. cacabata Penard, TE, 1919 – central Himalayas to south Tibet and northeast India
- M. s. rothschildi (Baker, ECS, 1923) – central, south China to north Myanmar and northwest Vietnam

== Description ==
The dark-sided flycatcher is 13 to 14 cm (5.1 to 5.5 in) in overall length. The upperparts are plain and dark grey-brown apart from a pale wingbar and pale edging to the tertial feathers. The breast and flanks have a variable amount of streaky dark grey-brown. The pale submoustachial stripe and dark malar stripe outline the white throat and half-collar. The centre of the lower breast and belly is white while the undertail-coverts are white with dark centres to the feathers. The bill is short and dark and the feet are black. The eye is large and has a whitish ring around it. The adults of both sexes are alike but juveniles have pale spots on the upperparts, a mottled breast and buff tips to the wing-coverts.

The dark-sided flycatcher differs from the similar Asian brown flycatcher (Muscicapa dauurica) which has rather plain pale underparts and from the grey-streaked flycatcher (Muscicapa griseisticta) which is white below with distinct grey streaks. The wings of the dark-sided flycatcher have a longer primary projection than the Asian brown flycatcher.

The song is a series of thin, high-pitched notes with trills and whistles. The call is a metallic tinkling.

== Distribution ==
The subspecies M. s. sibirica breeds in south-east Siberia westward to beyond Lake Baikal as well as in Mongolia, north-east China, North Korea and Japan (Hokkaidō and northern Honshū). M. s. rothschildi breeds in western China and Myanmar. M. s. gulmergi occurs from Afghanistan to Kashmir with M. s. cacabata from the eastern Himalayas to south-east Tibet and perhaps Myanmar.

The wintering range includes north-east India, Bangladesh, southern China, Taiwan and South-east Asia as far as Sumatra, Java, Borneo and the Philippines (Palawan and Culion). Vagrant birds have been recorded in Alaska, Iceland and Bermuda.

It inhabits coniferous and mixed forest and woodland and is sometimes seen in plantations, parks and gardens. It typically occurs in mountainous regions, reaching 4000 metres above sea-level in some areas.

== Behaviour ==
Like other flycatchers, its feeding technique is to perch on an exposed branch and wait. When an insect flies past, the bird dashes out to snatch it.

The female builds a cup-shaped nest up to 8 metres above the ground, on the branch of a tree or sometimes in a hole. Three to four eggs are laid. These are incubated by the female who is fed by the male.
