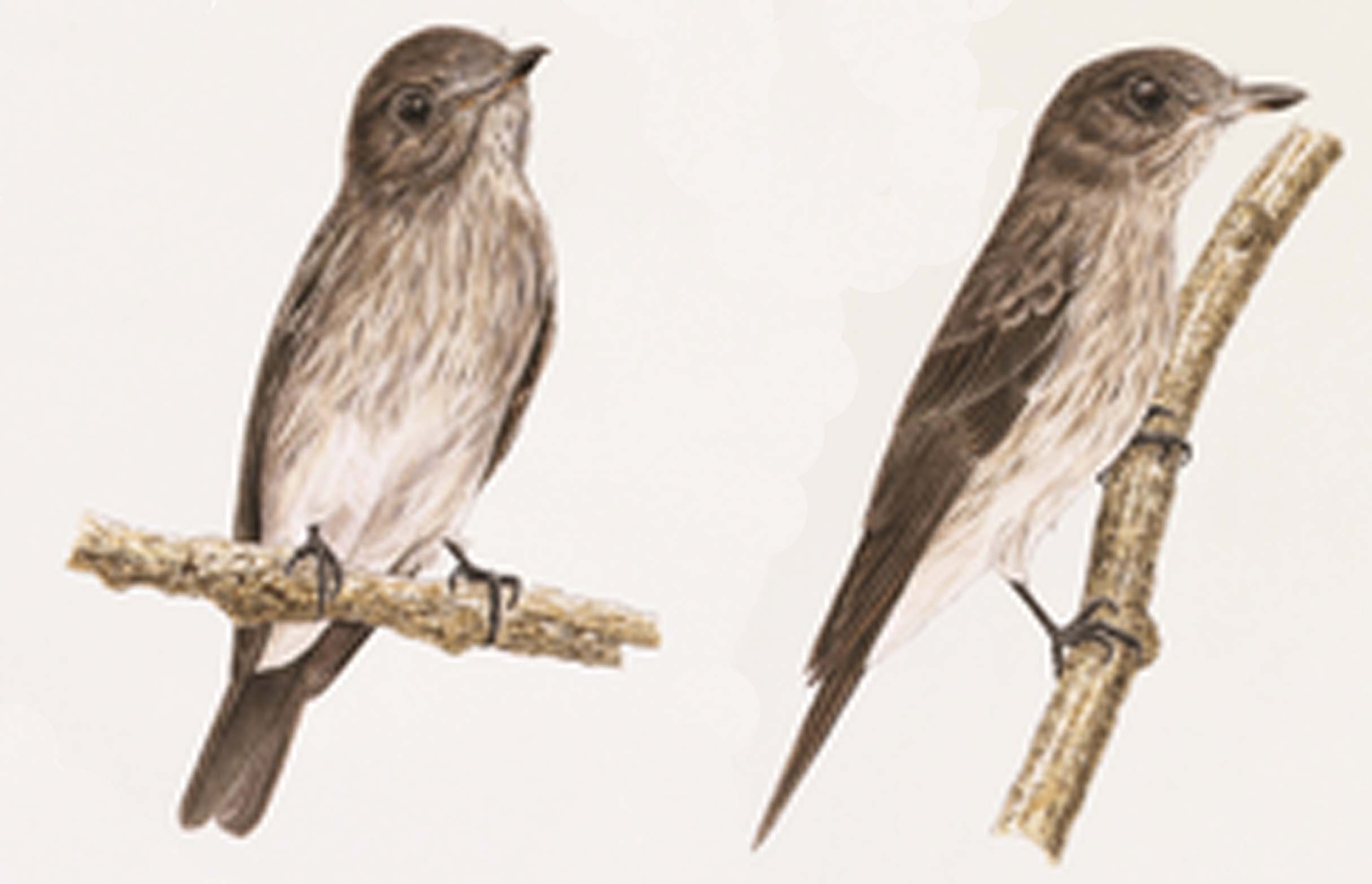
- side view (left) and front view (right)
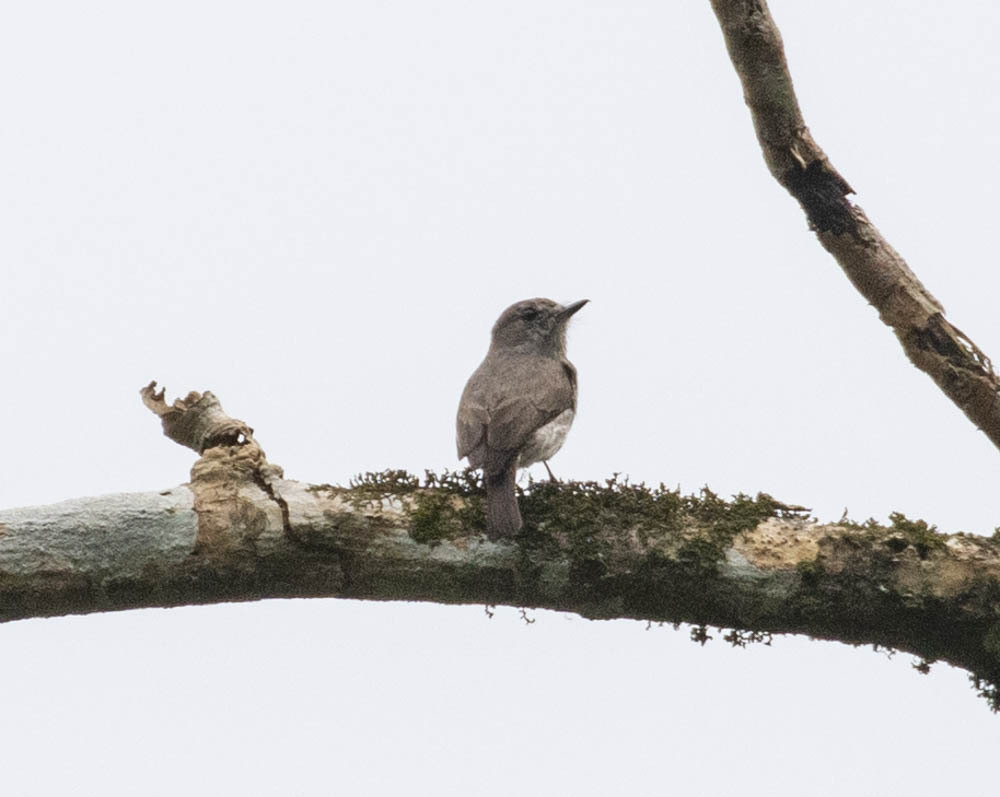

Scientific classification
- Kingdom: Animalia
- Phylum: Chordata
- Class: Aves
- Order: Passeriformes
- Family: Muscicapidae
- Genus: Muscicapa
- Species: M. sodhii

Binomial name
- Muscicapa sodhii Harris et al., 2014

= Sulawesi streaked flycatcher =

Species of bird

The Sulawesi streaked flycatcher (Muscicapa sodhii) is a small passerine bird in the Old World flycatcher family. It has only been recorded in Sulawesi, where it is known to breed. It appears not to be endangered, being less sensitive to disturbance than many of Southeast Asia's forest-dependent birds.

The species was first announced in 1999 but no formal description was included in the report. Its Latin name, Muscicapa sodhii, was given in honor of Navjot Sodhi (1962-2011), an Indian ornithologist and conservationist.

The bird is about 14 cm (5.5 in) long and has a streaked brownish-grey plumage, with a pale throat and breast. It has a distinctive white eye-ring and a blackish bill. The Sulawesi streaked flycatcher is usually found in the forest understorey and midstory, where it feeds on insects, such as flies, ants, and beetles.

The bird was first described in 2014 by a team of ornithologists from the Wildlife Conservation Society and the Indonesian Institute of Sciences. It was named after the late Mr. Sodhi, a conservationist from Sulawesi who had dedicated his life to protecting the island's wildlife.

The Sulawesi streaked flycatcher is considered to be a vulnerable species due to habitat loss caused by deforestation and conversion of forested areas to agriculture. The bird is currently protected under Indonesian law, and conservation efforts are underway to protect its habitat and ensure its survival.

The Sulawesi streaked flycatcher looks similar to the grey-streaked flycatcher, which lives part of the year in Sulawesi, but breeds in Northern Asia. Genetically, it is more closely related to the Thai population of Asian brown flycatcher M. dauurica siamensis.

While there is not a lot of information available on the Sulawesi streaked flycatcher, there are scientific papers and reports published on the bird that provide more detailed information on its biology, behavior, and conservation status.
