= Dusky flycatcher =

Dusky flycatcher may refer to:

- American dusky flycatcher
- African dusky flycatcher
