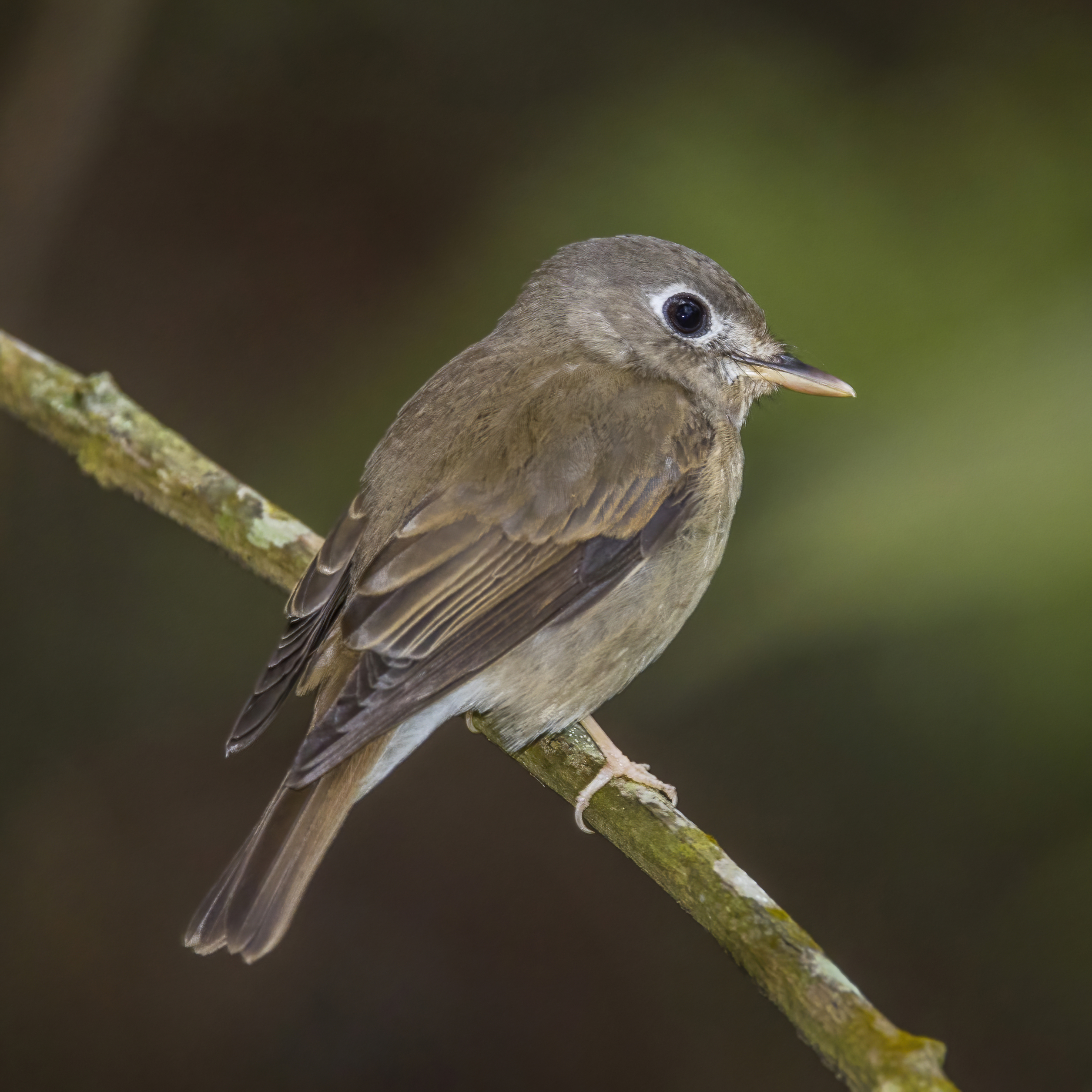

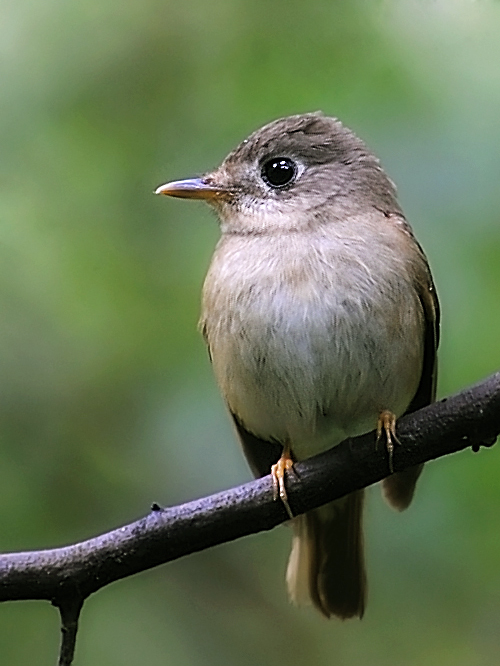

Conservation status
- Least Concern (IUCN 3.1)

Scientific classification
- Kingdom: Animalia
- Phylum: Chordata
- Class: Aves
- Order: Passeriformes
- Family: Muscicapidae
- Genus: Muscicapa
- Species: M. muttui

Binomial name
- Muscicapa muttui (Layard, 1854)

Synonyms
- Alseonax muttui Butalis muttui

= Brown-breasted flycatcher =

Species of bird

The brown-breasted flycatcher or Layard's flycatcher (Muscicapa muttui) is a small passerine bird in the flycatcher family Muscicapidae. The species breeds in north eastern India, central and Southern China and northern Burma and Thailand, and migrates to southern India and Sri Lanka. It forages for insects below the forest canopy, often close to the forest floor.

== Description ==
The brown-breasted flycatcher is 13–14 cm in length and weighs between 10 and 14 g. The overall colour of the upper parts is olive brown. Some of the feather shafts are darker. The upper tail coverts are brighter rufous as are the edges of the flight feathers. The tail feathers have rufous on the outer webs. The lores are pale and the eye ring is conspicuous. The chin and throat are white while the breast and sides of the body are pale brown. The middle of the body to the vent is buffy white. Submoustachial stripes are faint but mark the boundary of the pale chin while the legs and lower mandible are pale flesh coloured. The most similar species is the Asian brown flycatcher, which has black rather than pale legs. It was named by Layard after Muttu, his servant who brought him the specimen.

Although no ringing evidence exists to prove their migration, it is thought that the winter migrants in southern India and Sri Lanka come from north-east India and northern Thailand. A subspecies stötzneri (incorrectly spelt as stotmani by E C Stuart Baker) described from Szechwan by Hugo Weigold in 1922 appears to fall within the range of visible geographic variations and is not usually recognized.

The usual call is very faint tseet audible only at close range or a series of notes chi-chi-chi-chi ending with a low chit-chit.
