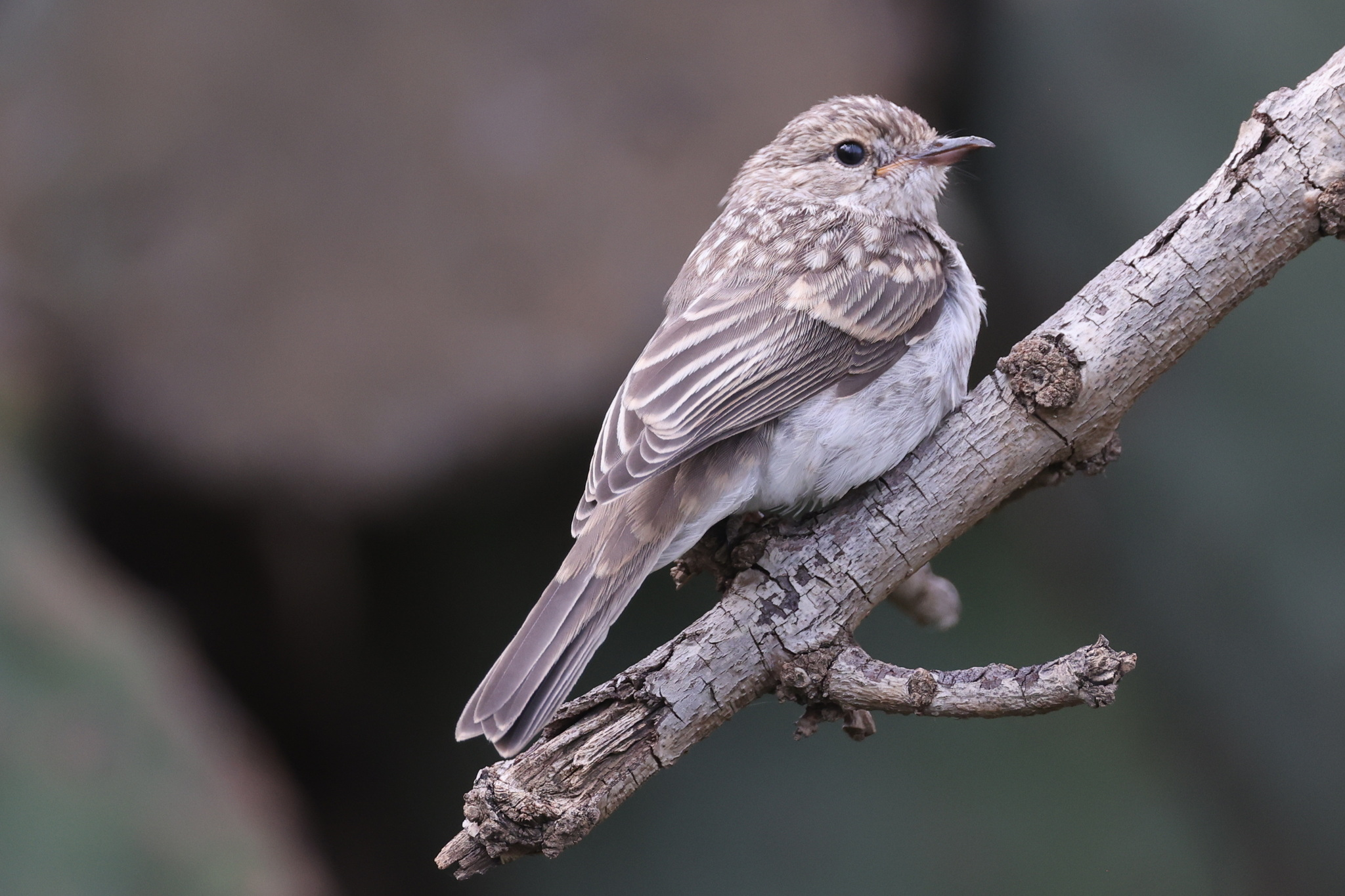

Conservation status
- Least Concern (IUCN 3.1)

Scientific classification
- Kingdom: Animalia
- Phylum: Chordata
- Class: Aves
- Order: Passeriformes
- Family: Muscicapidae
- Genus: Muscicapa
- Species: M. gambagae

Binomial name
- Muscicapa gambagae (Alexander, 1901)

= Gambaga flycatcher =

Species of bird

The Gambaga flycatcher (Muscicapa gambagae) is a species of bird in the family Muscicapidae. It is sparsely distributed across the Sudan (region) and the Arabian Highlands. Its natural habitats are subtropical or tropical dry forests, dry savanna, and subtropical or tropical dry shrubland of low to medium canopy height.

It is similar in appearance to the spotted flycatcher, but can be distinguished by its smaller size and less distinct streaking.
