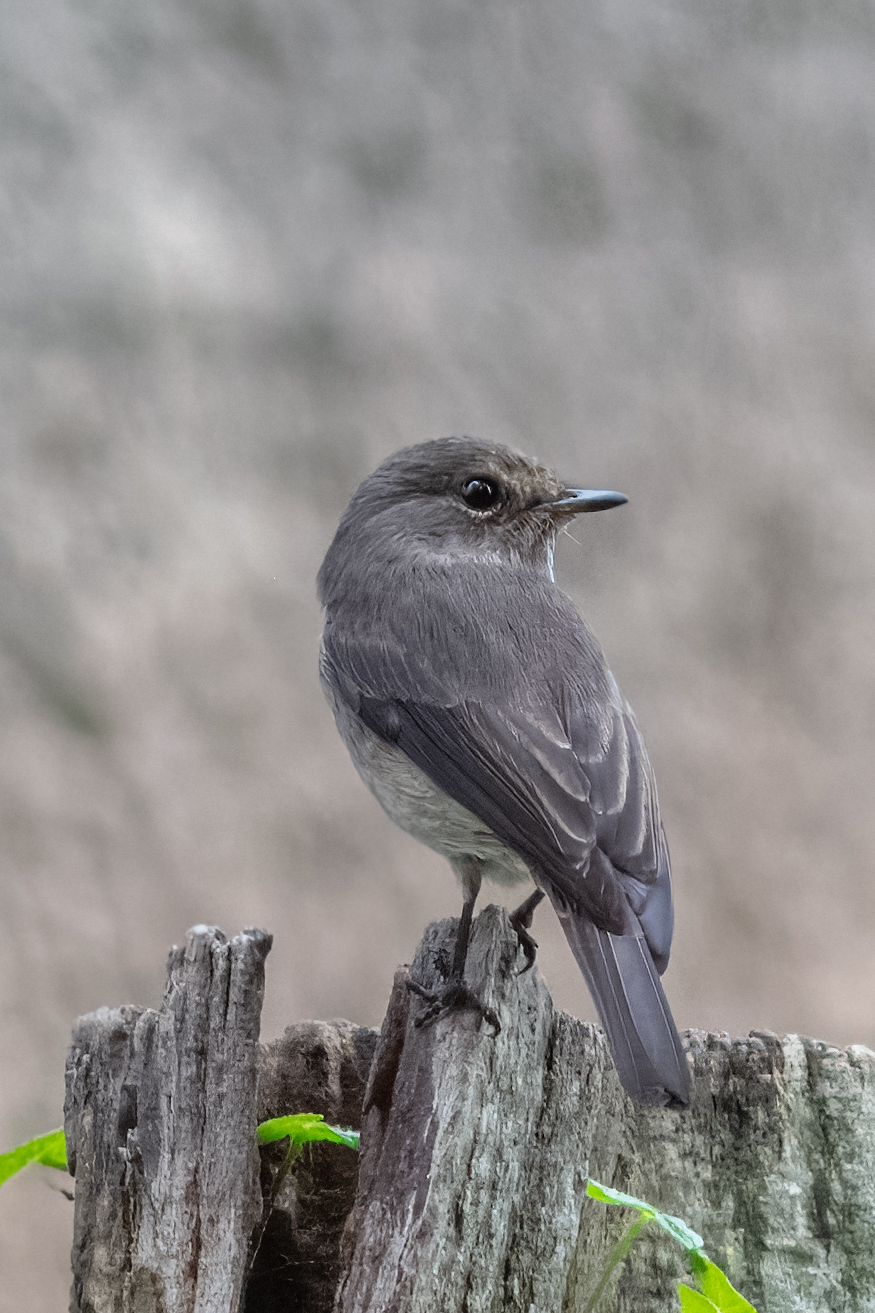

Conservation status
- Least Concern (IUCN 3.1)

Scientific classification
- Kingdom: Animalia
- Phylum: Chordata
- Class: Aves
- Order: Passeriformes
- Family: Muscicapidae
- Genus: Muscicapa
- Species: M. aquatica

Binomial name
- Muscicapa aquatica Heuglin, 1864

= Swamp flycatcher =

Species of bird

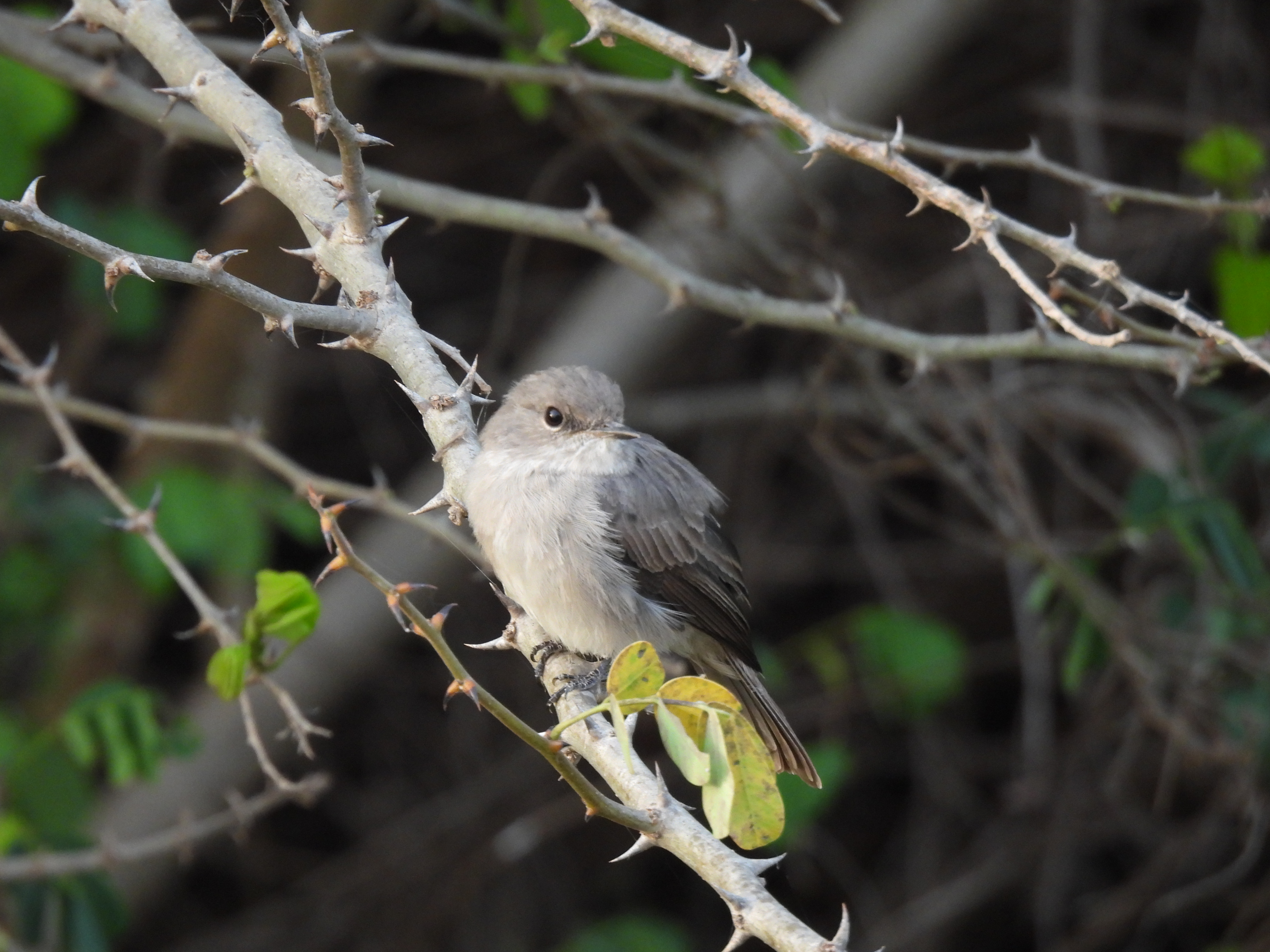
Swamp Flycatcher (Muscicapa aquatica), Janjanbureh, Gambia, December 2021

The swamp flycatcher or swamp alseonax (Muscicapa aquatica) is a species of bird in the family Muscicapidae. Its range stretches east across the Sudan (region) and south towards Zambia. Its natural habitats are subtropical or tropical moist shrubland and swamps.
