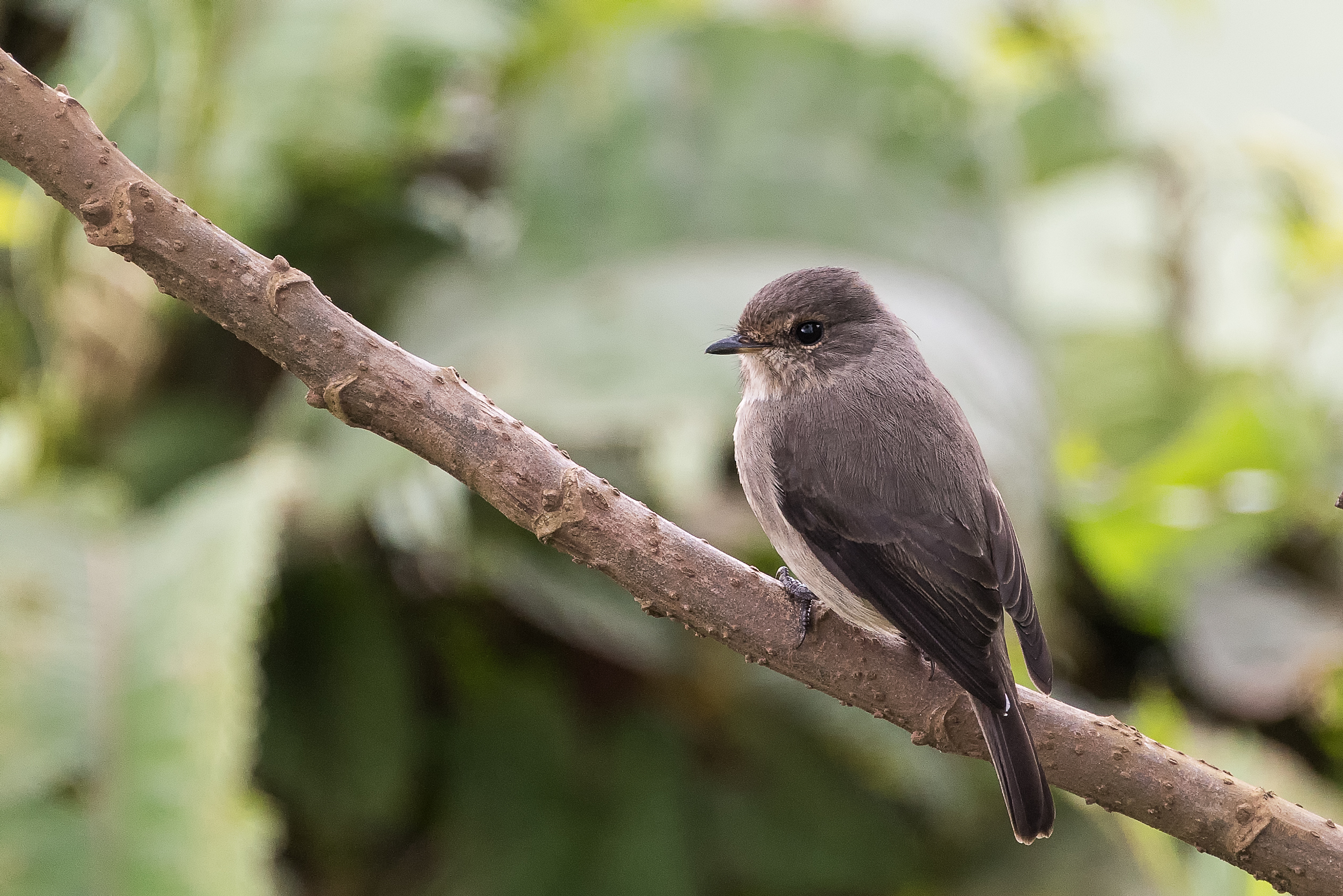

Conservation status
- Least Concern (IUCN 3.1)

Scientific classification
- Kingdom: Animalia
- Phylum: Chordata
- Class: Aves
- Order: Passeriformes
- Family: Muscicapidae
- Genus: Muscicapa
- Species: M. adusta

Binomial name
- Muscicapa adusta (Boie, 1828)

= African dusky flycatcher =

Species of bird

The African dusky flycatcher (Muscicapa adusta), also known as the dusky-brown flycatcher or dusky alseonax, is a small passerine bird of the Old World flycatcher family, Muscicapidae. It is a resident breeder in elevated areas of Sub-Saharan Africa (including the Bié and Western High plateaus). It is very common in its woodland habitat, which includes riverine forests, evergreen forest edges and clearings, especially near water bodies such as lakes, dams and streams, and well-wooded suburban gardens.

== Description ==
The African dusky flycatcher is 13 cm (5.1 in) long and weighs around 11 g (0.39 oz). Its upperparts are plain brown, with the only facial marking being an indistinct narrow eye-ring. The chin is plain pale grey, and the rest of the underparts are grey-brown with indistinct streaks. The short, straight, laterally flattened bill is black, the legs and feet are grey, and the eyes are brown. The sexes are similar, but the juvenile is spotted with buff above, and is whitish spotted with brown below.

This species is similar to the common migrant, the spotted flycatcher, Muscicapa striata, but is smaller and darker, especially on the underparts, than that species. Spotted flycatcher also has a streaked forehead, a feature not shown by the African dusky flycatcher.

The African dusky flycatcher has soft, high-pitched "tzeeet" and tsirit calls.

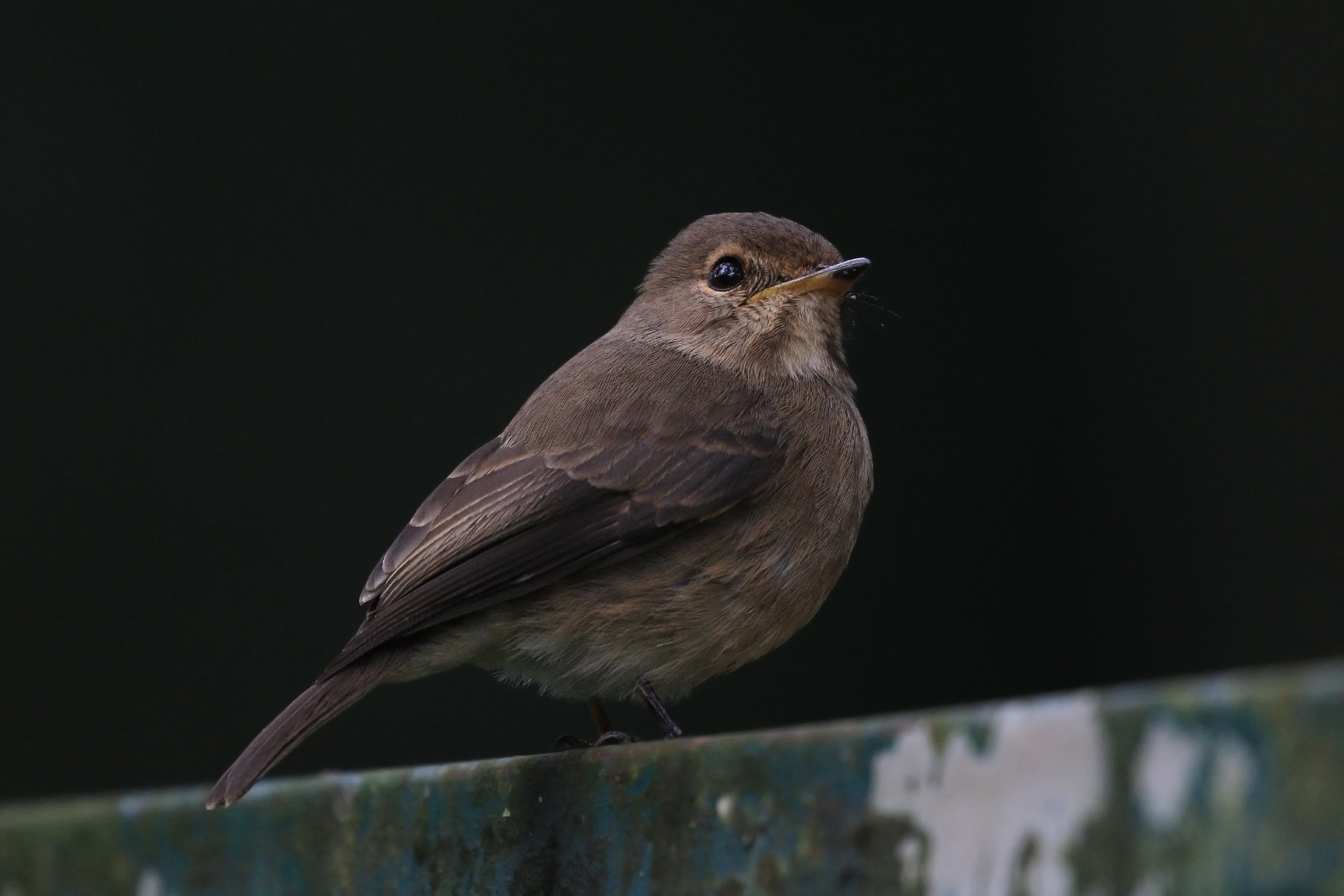
Juvenile, Bwindi Impenetrable Forest, Uganda

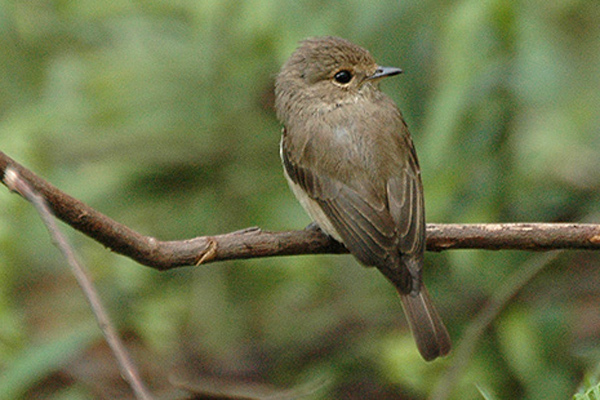

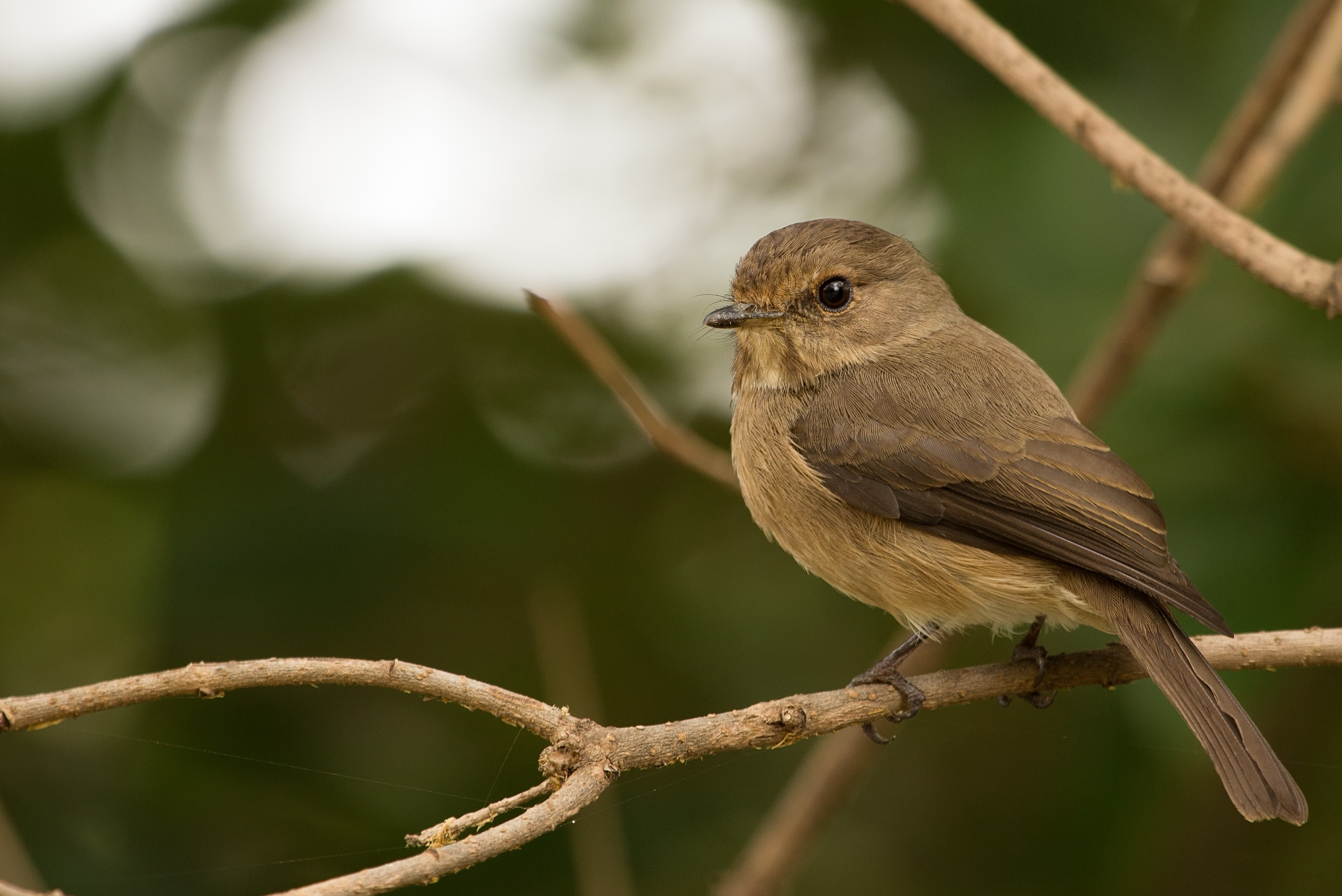
Lake Naivasha, Kenya
possibly M. a. marsabit

== Behaviour ==
The African dusky flycatcher builds a cup-shaped nest in a tree cavity a few metres above the ground, and lays two or three green eggs. The hole in the tree is normally reused in the next breeding season. This species is monogamous, mating for life.

The African dusky flycatcher is usually seen singly or in pairs. It forages from an open perch for insects typically taking its prey in a short flight.

== Conservation status ==
This common species has a large range, with an estimated extent of 2,300,000 km^{2} (890,000 sq mi). The population size is believed to be large, and the species is not believed to approach the thresholds for the population decline criterion of the IUCN Red List (i.e. declining more than 30% in ten years or three generations). For these reasons, the species is evaluated as Least Concern.

== General and cited references ==
- Ian Sinclair, Phil Hockey and Warwick Tarboton (2002). SASOL Birds of Southern Africa. Struik. ISBN 1-86872-721-1.
