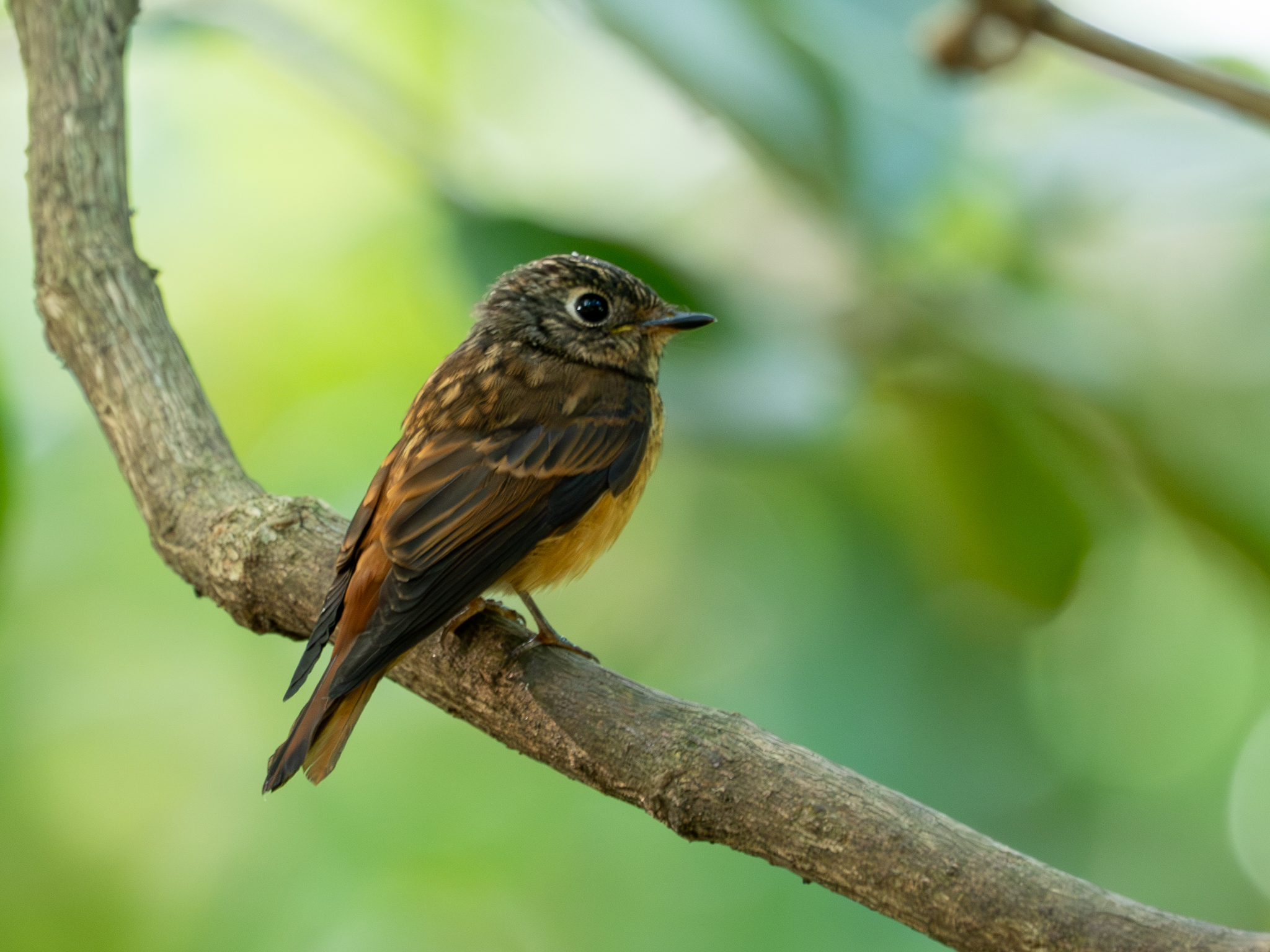

Conservation status
- Least Concern (IUCN 3.1)

Scientific classification
- Kingdom: Animalia
- Phylum: Chordata
- Class: Aves
- Order: Passeriformes
- Family: Muscicapidae
- Genus: Muscicapa
- Species: M. ferruginea

Binomial name
- Muscicapa ferruginea (Hodgson, 1845)

= Ferruginous flycatcher =

Species of bird

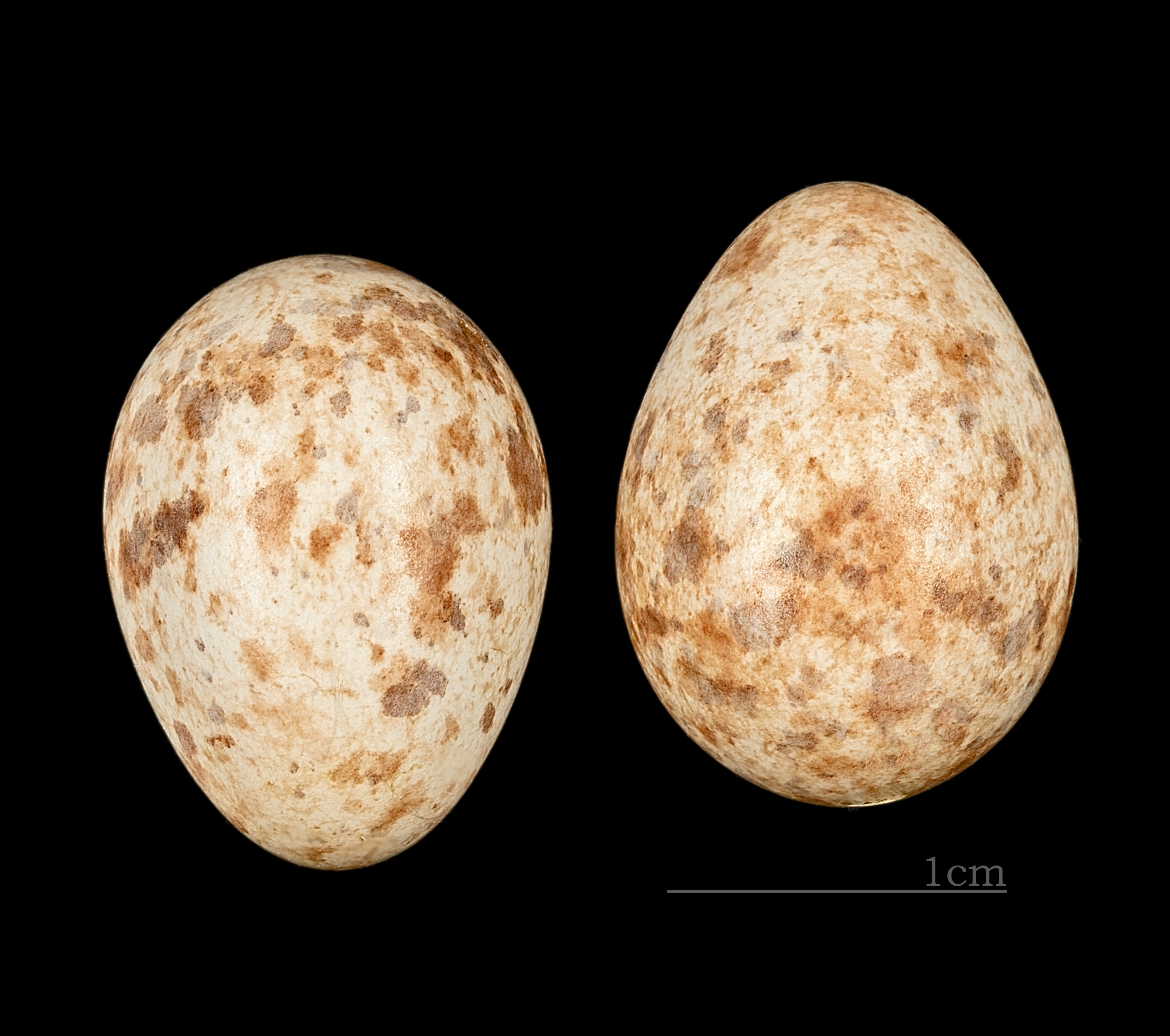
Eggs of Muscicapa ferruginea MHNT

The ferruginous flycatcher (Muscicapa ferruginea) is a species of bird in the family Muscicapidae.

It is native to the eastern Himalayas, the Purvanchal Range and central/southern China; it winters to Hainan and Southeast Asia.

Its natural habitat is subtropical or tropical moist montane forests.

== Gallery ==
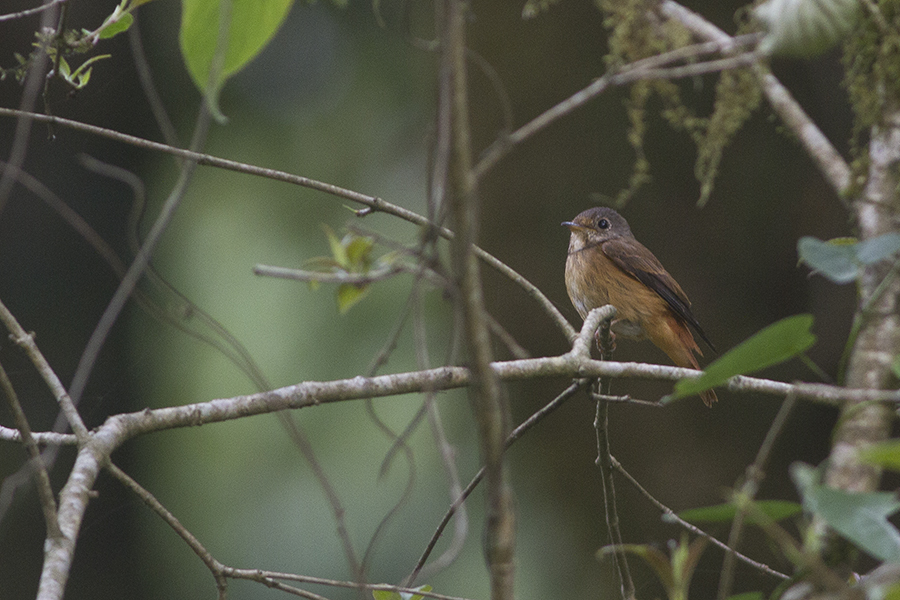
From Khangchendzonga National Park in West Sikkim, India.

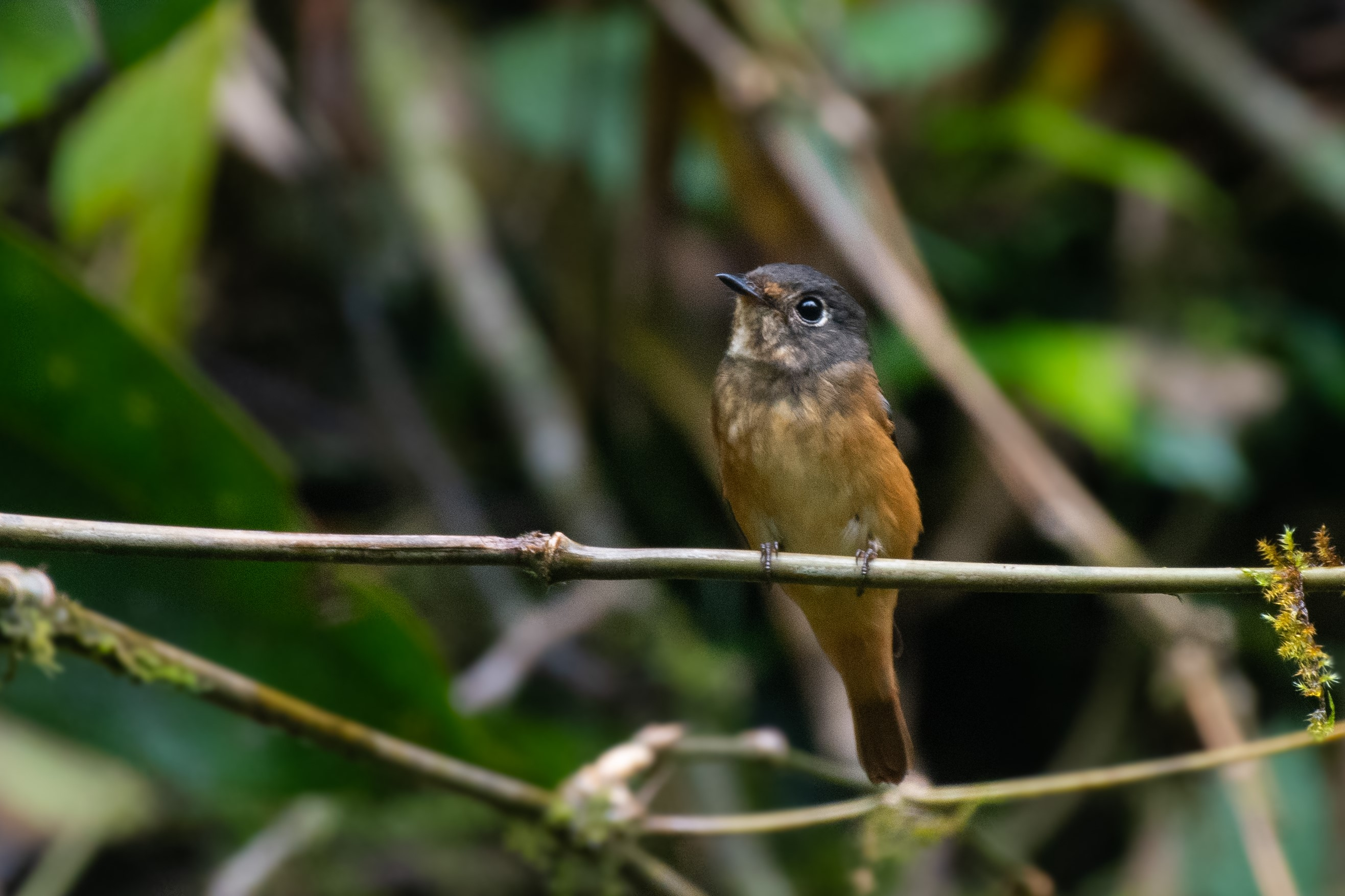
From Eaglenest Wildlife Sanctuary in Arunachal Pradesh, India.

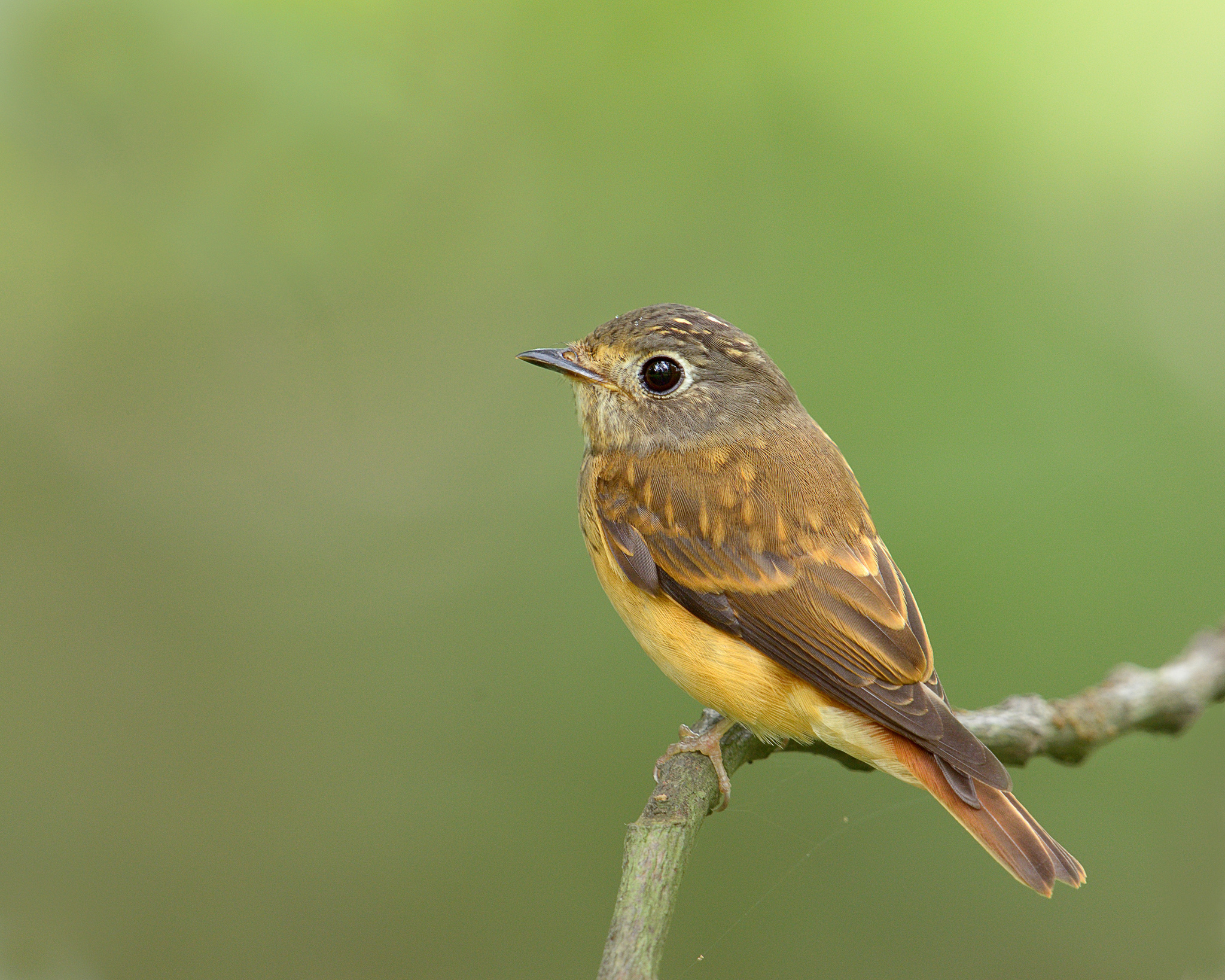
