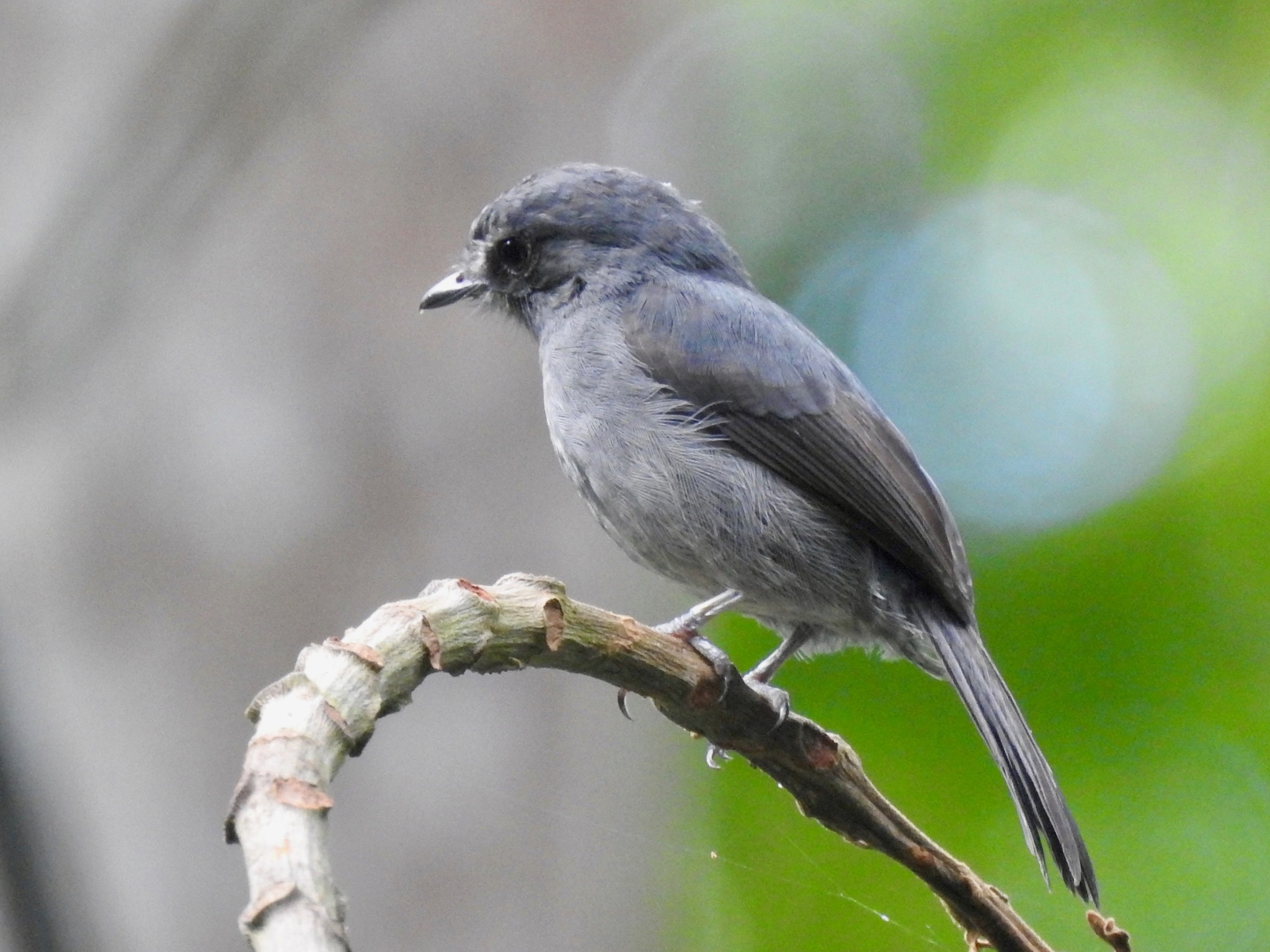

Conservation status
- Least Concern (IUCN 3.1)

Scientific classification
- Kingdom: Animalia
- Phylum: Chordata
- Class: Aves
- Order: Passeriformes
- Family: Muscicapidae
- Genus: Muscicapa
- Species: M. epulata

Binomial name
- Muscicapa epulata (Cassin, 1855)

Synonyms
- Butalis epulatus (protonym)

= Little grey flycatcher =

Species of bird

The little grey flycatcher (Muscicapa epulata) or little grey alseonax, is a species of bird in the family Muscicapidae. It is found throughout the African tropical rainforest. Its natural habitat is subtropical or tropical moist lowland forests.
