= Muscicapa petenyii =

Muscicapa petenyii Temporal range: Pliocene

Scientific classification
- Kingdom: Animalia
- Phylum: Chordata
- Class: Aves
- Order: Passeriformes
- Family: Muscicapidae
- Genus: Muscicapa
- Species: †M. petenyii

Binomial name
- †Muscicapa petenyii Kessler, 2013

Extinct species of bird

Muscicapa petenyii is an extinct species of Old World flycatcher: a passerine bird in the genus Muscicapa that inhabited Hungary during the Neogene period.

== Etymology ==
The specific epithet "petenyii" is a tribute to János Salamon Petényi, a Hungarian paleontologist.
