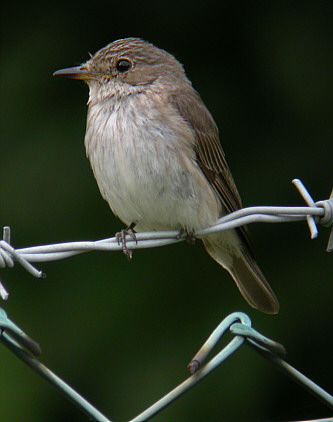
- Spotted flycatcher (M. striata)

Scientific classification
- Kingdom: Animalia
- Phylum: Chordata
- Class: Aves
- Order: Passeriformes
- Family: Muscicapidae
- Genus: Muscicapa; Brisson, 1760

Type species
- Motacilla striata Pallas, 1764

Species
- see text

= Muscicapa =

Genus of birds

Muscicapa is a genus of passerine birds belonging to the Old World flycatcher family Muscicapidae, and therein to the typical flycatchers of subfamily Muscicapinae. They are widespread across Europe, Africa and Asia with most species occurring in forest and woodland habitats. Several species are migratory, moving south from Europe and northern Asia for the winter.

They are small birds, 9 to 15 cm (3.5 to 5.9 in) in length. They have a large head, short tail and a flattened bill, broader at the base. Their plumage is mostly drab brown or grey and rather plain. Young birds tend to be more spotted or mottled.

Muscicapa flycatchers typically feed on flying insects which are caught by sallying out from an exposed perch. The nest is usually cup-shaped and built on a tree branch but some African species nest in tree holes.

== Taxonomy and systematics ==
The genus was introduced by the French zoologist Mathurin Jacques Brisson in 1760 with the spotted flycatcher (Muscicapa striata) as the type species. The word Muscicapa comes from the Latin musca, a fly and capere, to catch.

In 2010 two large molecular phylogenetic studies of species within Muscicapidae showed that Muscicapa was non-monophyletic. The authors were unable to propose a revised genus as not all the species were sampled. A subsequent study published in 2016 included 37 of the 42 Muscicapini species. It confirmed that Muscicapa was non-monophyletic and proposed a reorganised arrangement with several new or resurrected genera.

=== Extant species ===
The genus Muscicapa contains the follow 18 extant species of flycatchers:

Image	Common name	Scientific name	Distribution
	Grey-streaked flycatcher	Muscicapa griseisticta	Manchuria and Kamchatka; winters in Southeast Asia
	Ferruginous flycatcher	Muscicapa ferruginea	Bangladesh, Bhutan, China, Indonesia, Japan, Laos, Malaysia, Myanmar, Nepal, the Philippines, India, Singapore, Taiwan, Thailand, and Vietnam.
	Dark-sided flycatcher	Muscicapa sibirica	Asia
	Asian brown flycatcher	Muscicapa dauurica	Japan, eastern Siberia, southern India, Sri Lanka east to Indonesia and Vietnam, and the Himalayas
	Ashy-breasted flycatcher	Muscicapa randi	Philippines
	Sumba brown flycatcher	Muscicapa segregata	Indonesia
	Brown-breasted flycatcher	Muscicapa muttui	north eastern India, central and Southern China and northern Burma, Thailand and Vietnam, and migrates to southern India and Sri Lanka.
	Sulawesi streaked flycatcher	Muscicapa sodhii	Sulawesi
	Brown-streaked flycatcher	Muscicapa williamsoni	southern Myanmar, southern Thailand, northern peninsular Malaysia, and northeast Borneo
	African dusky flycatcher	Muscicapa adusta	elevated areas of Sub-Saharan Africa
	Little grey flycatcher	Muscicapa epulata	African tropical rainforest
	Yellow-footed flycatcher	Muscicapa sethsmithi	African tropical rainforest
	Humblot's flycatcher	Muscicapa flavirostris	Grand Comoro Island
	Spotted flycatcher	Muscicapa striata	Mediterranean and Europe to Central Asia, wintering in sub-Saharan Africa
	Mediterranean flycatcher	Muscicapa tyrrhenica	the Balearic Islands, Corsica and Sardinia, and is migratory, wintering in Africa
	Gambaga flycatcher	Muscicapa gambagae	Sudan (region) and Arabian Highlands
	Cassin's flycatcher	Muscicapa cassini	African tropical rainforest
	Swamp flycatcher	Muscicapa aquatica	Sudan (region) and south towards Zambia

=== Extinct species ===
There are at least three fossil species which are included in this genus:

- †Muscicapa leganyii (Middle Miocene of Felsőtárkány, Hungary)
- †Muscicapa miklosi (Late Miocene of Polgárdi, Hungary)
- †Muscicapa petenyii (Pliocene of Beremend, Hungary)

=== Former species ===
Formerly, some authorities also considered the following species (or subspecies) as species within the genus Muscicapa:

- Red-backed fairywren (as Muscicapa melanocephala)
- Australian golden whistler (as Muscicapa pectoralis)
- New Caledonian whistler (as Muscicapa caledonica)
- Rufous whistler (xanthetraea) (as Muscicapa xanthetraea)
- Little shrikethrush (as Muscicapa megarhyncha)
- Black-naped monarch (as Muscicapa azurea)
- Blue-mantled crested flycatcher (as Muscicapa cyanomelas)
- African paradise flycatcher (as Muscicapa viridis)
- Mascarene paradise flycatcher (as Muscicapa bourbonnensis)
- Hawaiʻi ʻelepaio (as Muscicapa sandwichensis)
- Tahiti monarch (as Muscicapa nigra)
- †Maupiti monarch (as Muscicapa Pomarea)
- Chuuk monarch (as Muscicapa Rugensis)
- Spot-winged monarch (as Muscicapa guttula)
- Hooded monarch (as Muscicapa manadensis)
- Island monarch (as Muscicapa inornata)
- Black-faced monarch (as Muscicapa melanopsis)
- Golden monarch (as Muscicapa chrysomela)
- Frilled monarch (as Muscicapa telescopthalmus)
- Shining flycatcher (chalybeocephala) (as Muscicapa chalybeocephalus)
- Black-capped bulbul (as Muscicapa melanictera)
- Light-vented bulbul (as Muscicapa sinensis)
- Yellow-vented bulbul (as Muscicapa goiavier)
