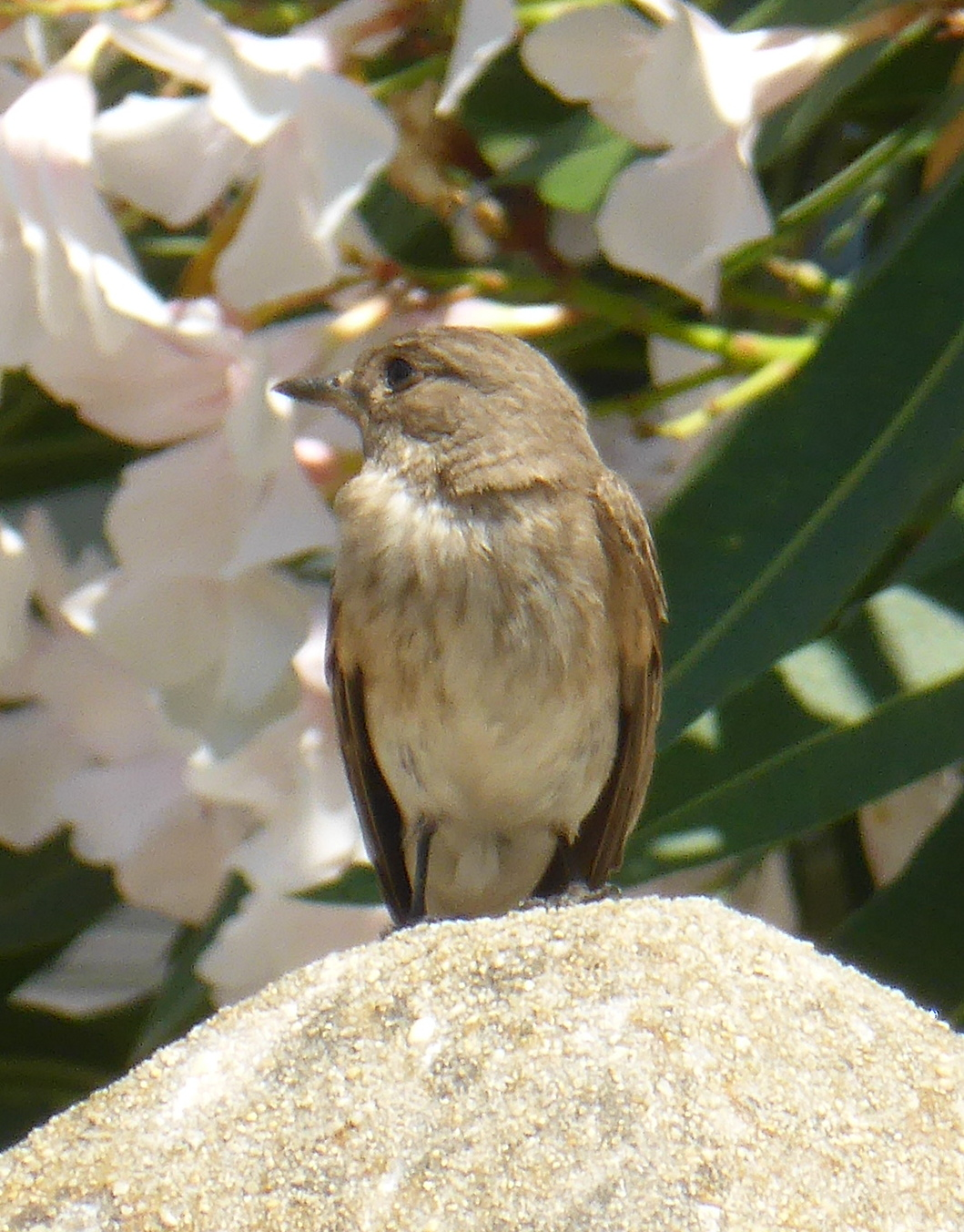
- In Ajaccio, Corsica

Scientific classification
- Domain: Eukaryota
- Kingdom: Animalia
- Phylum: Chordata
- Class: Aves
- Order: Passeriformes
- Family: Muscicapidae
- Genus: Muscicapa
- Species: M. tyrrhenica

Binomial name
- Muscicapa tyrrhenica Schiebel, 1910

= Mediterranean flycatcher =

Species of bird

The Mediterranean flycatcher (Muscicapa tyrrhenica) is a small passerine bird in the Old World flycatcher family. It breeds on the Balearic Islands, Corsica and Sardinia, and is migratory, wintering in Africa. The International Ornithologists' Union has split the species from the spotted flycatcher, but other taxonomic authorities considered it still conspecific.

This is an undistinguished looking bird with long wings and tail. The adults have grey-brown upperparts and whitish underparts, with a streaked crown and breast. The legs are short and black, and the bill is black and has the broad but pointed shape typical of aerial insectivores. Juveniles are browner than adults and have spots on the upperparts.

== Taxonomy ==
The first formal description of the Mediterranean flycatcher was by Guido Schiebel in 1910 who considered it as a subspecies of the spotted flycatcher and gave it the trinomial name Muscicapa striata tyrrhenica. A molecular phylogenetic study published in 2016 found that the subspecies M. s. tyrrhenica and M. s. balearica were genetically similar to each other but significantly different from the other spotted flycatcher subspecies. The authors proposed that these insular subspecies should be considered as a separate species.

There are two recognised subspecies which both winter in southern Africa. The breeding range is given below.

- M. t. balearica von Jordans, 1913 – Balearic Islands
- M. t. tyrrhenica Schiebel, 1910 – Corsica and Sardinia

== Description ==
The Mediterranean flycatcher is a small slim bird, around 14.5 cm (5.7 in) in length, with a weight of 14–20 g (0.49–0.71 oz). It has dull grey-brown upperparts and off-white underparts. The crown, throat and breast are streaked with brown while the wings and tail feathers are edged with paler thin margins. The subspecies M. t. tyrrhenica has paler and warmer plumage on the upperparts, with more diffuse markings on the head and breast. The sexes are alike. Juveniles have ochre-buff spots above and scaly brown spots below.

== Behaviour and ecology ==
Mediterranean flycatchers hunt from conspicuous perches, making sallies after passing flying insects, and often returning to the same perch. Their upright posture is characteristic.

Most passerines moult their primary flight feathers in sequence beginning near the body and proceeding outwards along the wing. The Mediterranean flycatcher is unusual in replacing the outer flight feathers before those nearer the body.

The flycatcher's call is a thin, drawn out soft and high pitched tssssseeeeeppppp, slightly descending in pitch.

They are birds of deciduous woodlands, parks and gardens, with a preference for open areas amongst trees.
