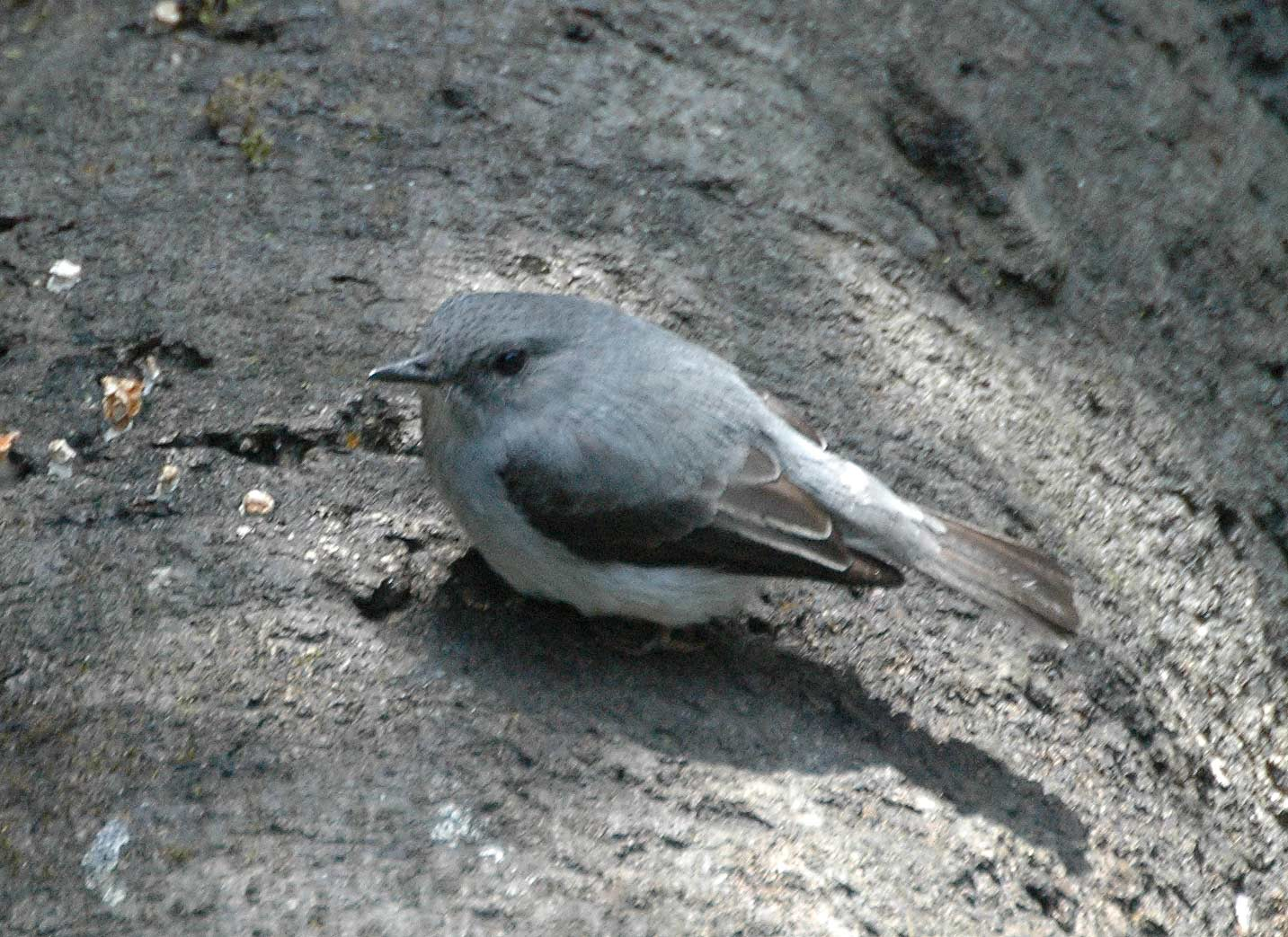

Conservation status
- Least Concern (IUCN 3.1)

Scientific classification
- Kingdom: Animalia
- Phylum: Chordata
- Class: Aves
- Order: Passeriformes
- Family: Muscicapidae
- Genus: Muscicapa
- Species: M. cassini

Binomial name
- Muscicapa cassini Heine, 1860

= Cassin's flycatcher =

Species of bird

Cassin's flycatcher (Muscicapa cassini), also known as Cassin's grey flycatcher or Cassin's alseonax, is a species of bird in the family Muscicapidae. It is native to the African tropical rainforest. Its natural habitat is subtropical or tropical swamps.
