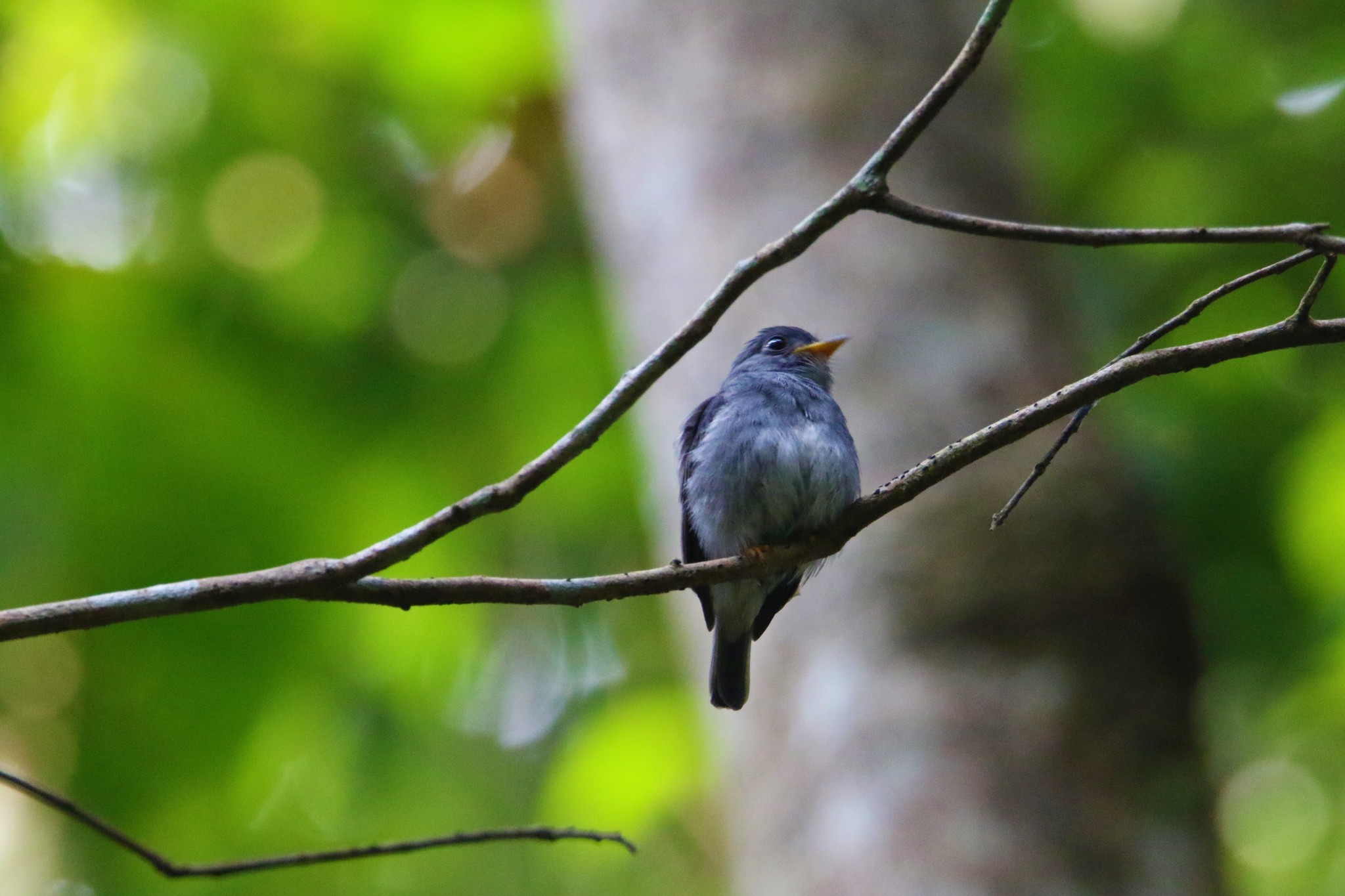

Conservation status
- Least Concern (IUCN 3.1)

Scientific classification
- Kingdom: Animalia
- Phylum: Chordata
- Class: Aves
- Order: Passeriformes
- Family: Muscicapidae
- Genus: Muscicapa
- Species: M. sethsmithi

Binomial name
- Muscicapa sethsmithi (Van Someren, 1922)

= Yellow-footed flycatcher =

Species of bird

The yellow-footed flycatcher or yellow-footed alseonax (Muscicapa sethsmithi) is a species of bird in the family Muscicapidae. It is found in Cameroon, Central African Republic, Republic of the Congo, Democratic Republic of the Congo, Equatorial Guinea, Gabon, Nigeria, and Uganda. Its natural habitat is subtropical or tropical moist lowland forests.
