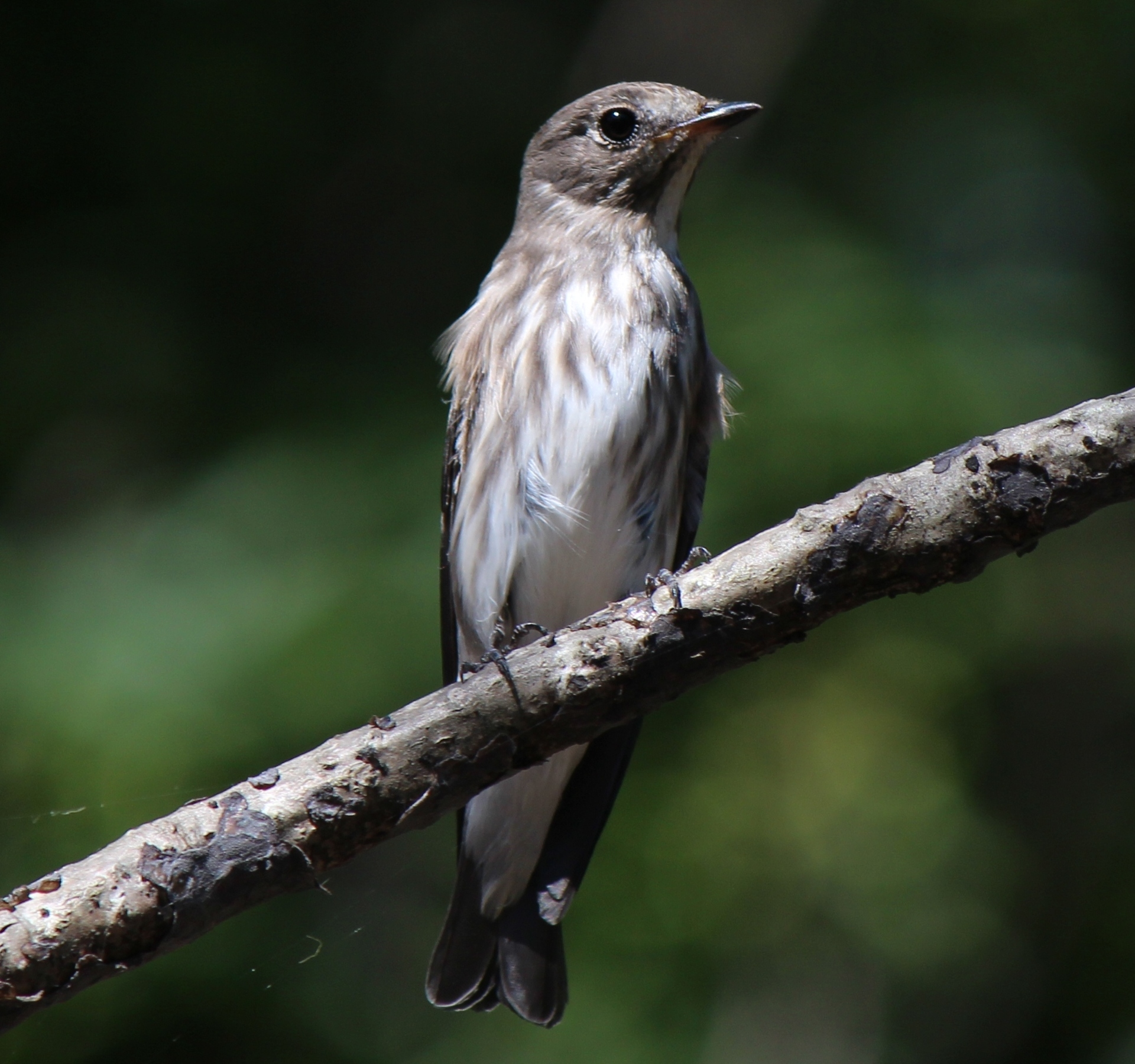
- Grey-streaked flycatcher in Japan

Conservation status
- Least Concern (IUCN 3.1)

Scientific classification
- Kingdom: Animalia
- Phylum: Chordata
- Class: Aves
- Order: Passeriformes
- Family: Muscicapidae
- Genus: Muscicapa
- Species: M. griseisticta

Binomial name
- Muscicapa griseisticta (R. Swinhoe, 1861)

= Grey-streaked flycatcher =

Species of bird

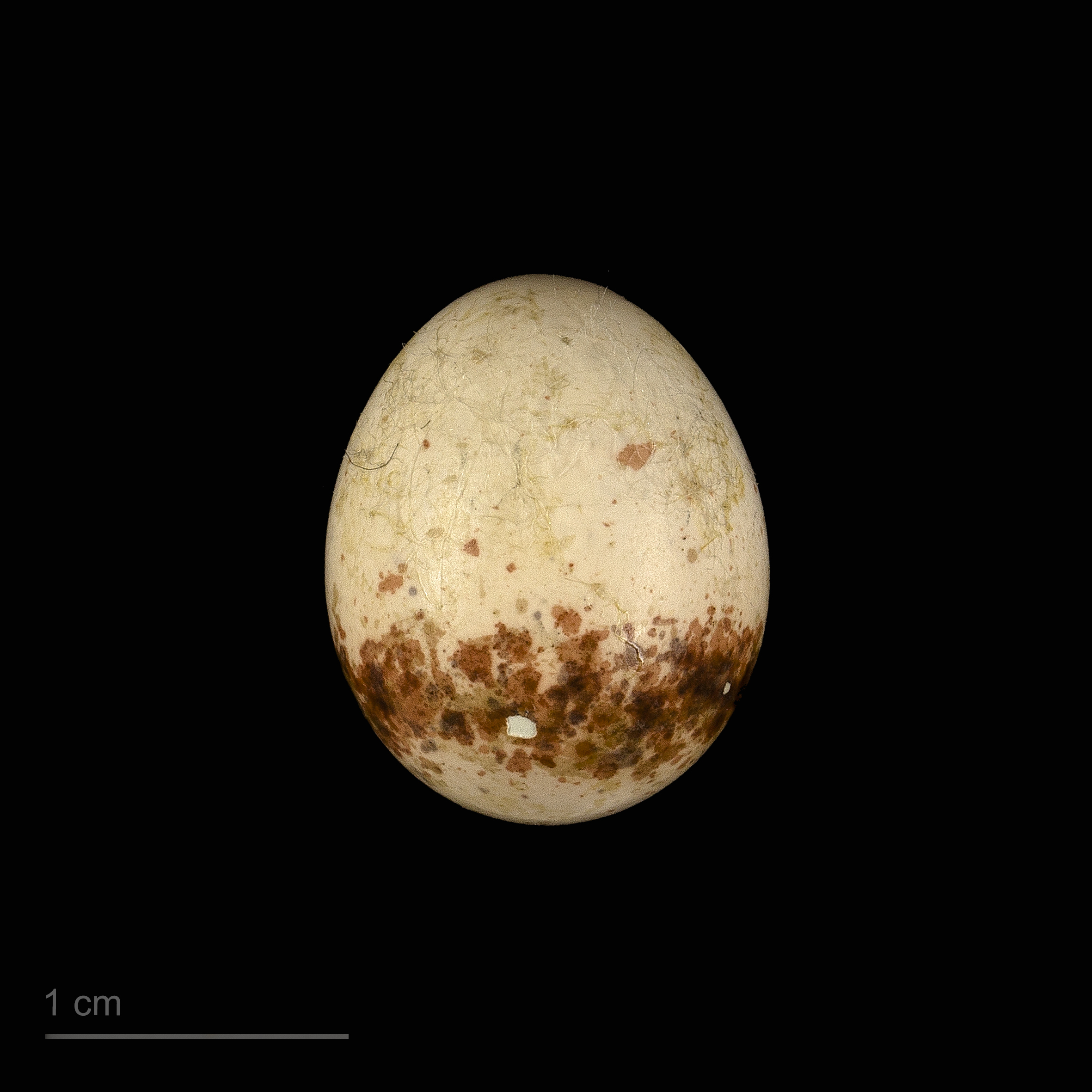
Muscicapa griseisticta - MHNT

The grey-streaked flycatcher or grey-spotted flycatcher (Muscicapa griseisticta) is a small passerine bird breeding in the eastern Palearctic belonging to the genus Muscicapa in the Old World flycatcher family Muscicapidae. The species was first described by Robert Swinhoe in 1861.

It is a slender, long-winged bird with a length of 13 to 15 cm. It is mainly grey brown above and white below. The breast and flanks are heavily streaked with grey. There is a narrow white bar on the wing and a pale patch between the bill and eye. The bill and feet are black. The eye is large and there is a white eye-ring. The adult male and female are alike but juvenile birds differ in having white spots and dark scaling on the upperparts.

It breeds in the vast coniferous forests in north-east China, North Korea and south-east Siberia including Sakhalin and Kamchatka. In spring and autumn it migrates through eastern and southern China, South Korea, Japan and Taiwan. In winter it occurs in forests, forest edges and open country with scattered trees in Borneo, the Philippines, Palau, eastern Indonesia and New Guinea. It is a vagrant to Singapore, Vietnam, Alaska and Australia.

It perches in the open, waiting for passing insects, then flies out up to 20 metres to catch them before returning to its perch and eating them.
