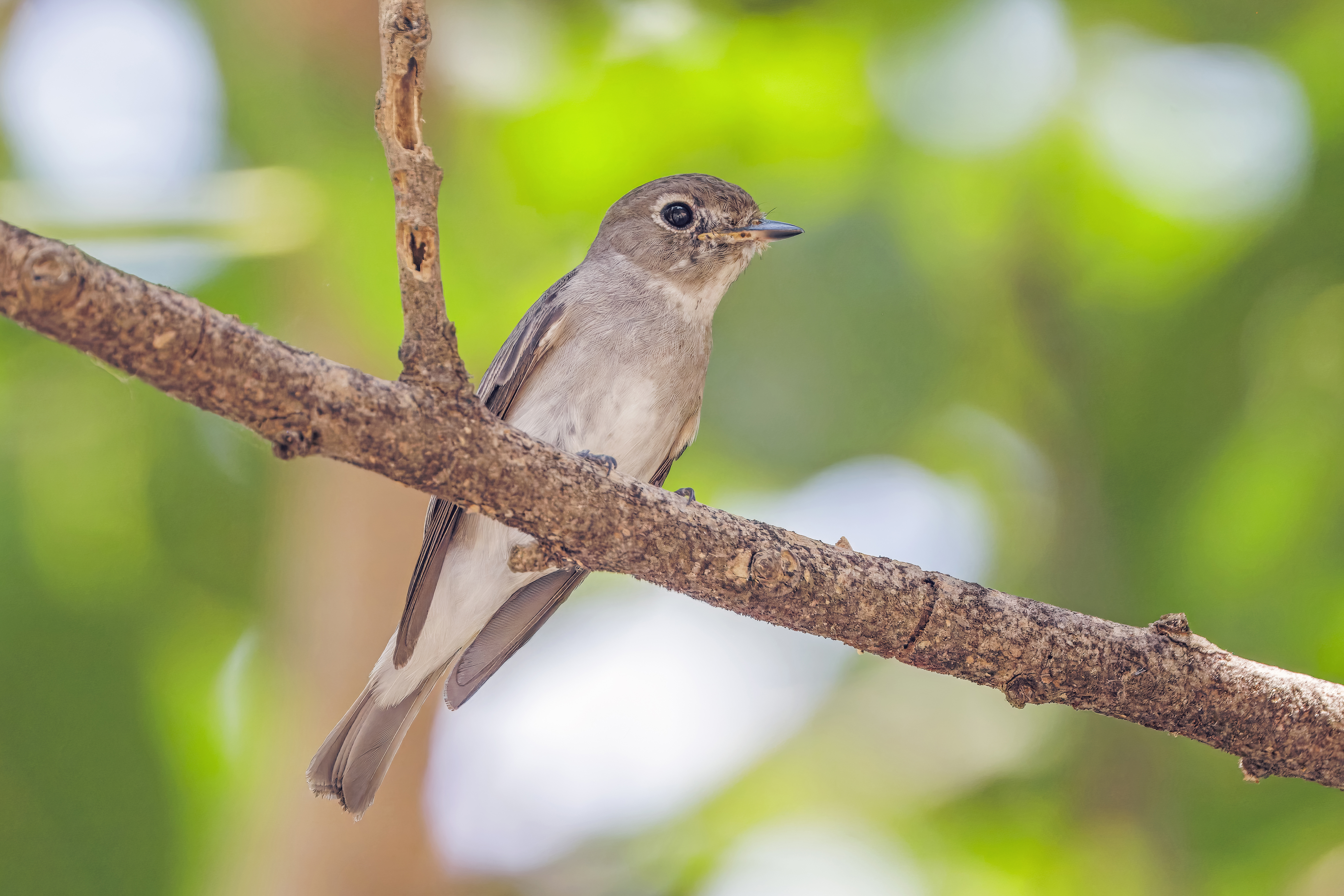
- M. d. saimensis, Cambodia

Conservation status
- Least Concern (IUCN 3.1)

Scientific classification
- Kingdom: Animalia
- Phylum: Chordata
- Class: Aves
- Order: Passeriformes
- Family: Muscicapidae
- Genus: Muscicapa
- Species: M. dauurica

Binomial name
- Muscicapa dauurica Pallas, 1811

Subspecies
- M. d. dauurica M. d. poonensis M. d. siamensis

Synonyms
- Muscicapa latirostris (Raffles, 1822)

= Asian brown flycatcher =

Species of bird of the genus Muscicapidae

The Asian brown flycatcher (Muscicapa dauurica) is a small passerine bird in the flycatcher family Muscicapidae. The word Muscicapa comes from the Latin musca, a fly and capere, to catch. The specific dauurica refers to Dauria, an area of south-eastern Siberia named after a local nomadic tribe.

This is an insectivorous species which breeds in Japan, eastern Siberia and the Himalayas. It is migratory and winters in tropical southern Asia from southern India and Sri Lanka east to Indonesia.

The correct specific epithet for this species is disputed.

== Description ==
This species is 13 cm (5.1 in) long, including the cocked tail. It is similar in shape to the larger spotted flycatcher, but is relatively longer-tailed. The dark bill is relatively large and broad-based. The adult has grey-brown upperparts, which become greyer as the plumage ages, and whitish underparts with brown-tinged flanks. Young birds have scaly brown upperparts, head and breast.

== Geographical variation ==
Although usually treated as monotypic if the brown-streaked flycatcher is not included, Rasmussen and Anderton, in Birds of South Asia. The Ripley Guide argue that populations in the Indian subcontinent and the Andaman Islands should be regarded as a separate subspecies, poonensis, from the nominate race which occupies most of the species' range. They describe poonensis as paler and browner above, with a deeper bill, and mostly pale lower mandible, a more mottled throat, breast and flanks (in fresh plumage), less contrastingly white "spectacles" and throat, and perhaps a more rounded wing.

== Behaviour ==
Asian brown flycatcher is a common bird found in open woodland and cultivated areas. It nests in a hole in a tree, laying four eggs which are incubated by the female.

The male Asian brown flycatcher sings a simple melodic song during courtship.

This bird is parasitised by the chewing louse Philopterus davuricae.

== Vagrancy ==
The Asian brown flycatcher is an extremely rare vagrant to Western Europe. Records have come from Britain, Denmark, and Sweden, and in addition, there are unproven claims from Ireland, the Faroe Islands, and Norway.

=== Britain ===
On 3 October 2007 a first winter brown flycatcher was discovered at Flamborough Head, East Riding of Yorkshire which attracted hundreds of birdwatchers during its stay which lasted until dusk of the following day. This looks set to become the first accepted record. A previous record, on Fair Isle, on 1–2 July 1992 was regarded by the BOURC as not definitely of wild origin. A bird had also been claimed on Holy Island, Northumberland on 9 September 1956, but the identification was not accepted beyond doubt.
