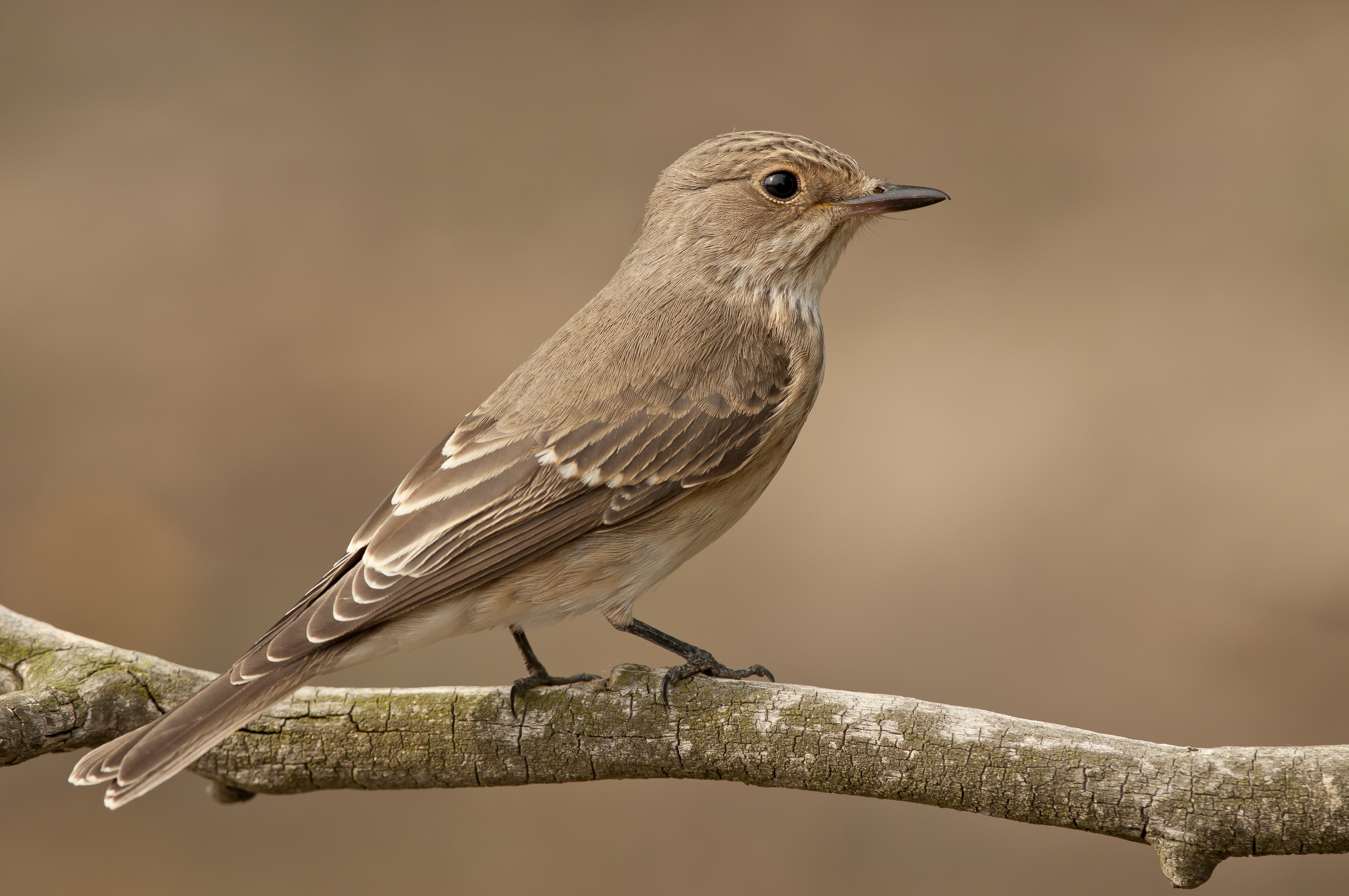
- In Ukraine

Conservation status
- Least Concern (IUCN 3.1)

Scientific classification
- Kingdom: Animalia
- Phylum: Chordata
- Class: Aves
- Order: Passeriformes
- Family: Muscicapidae
- Genus: Muscicapa
- Species: M. striata

Binomial name
- Muscicapa striata (Pallas, 1764)
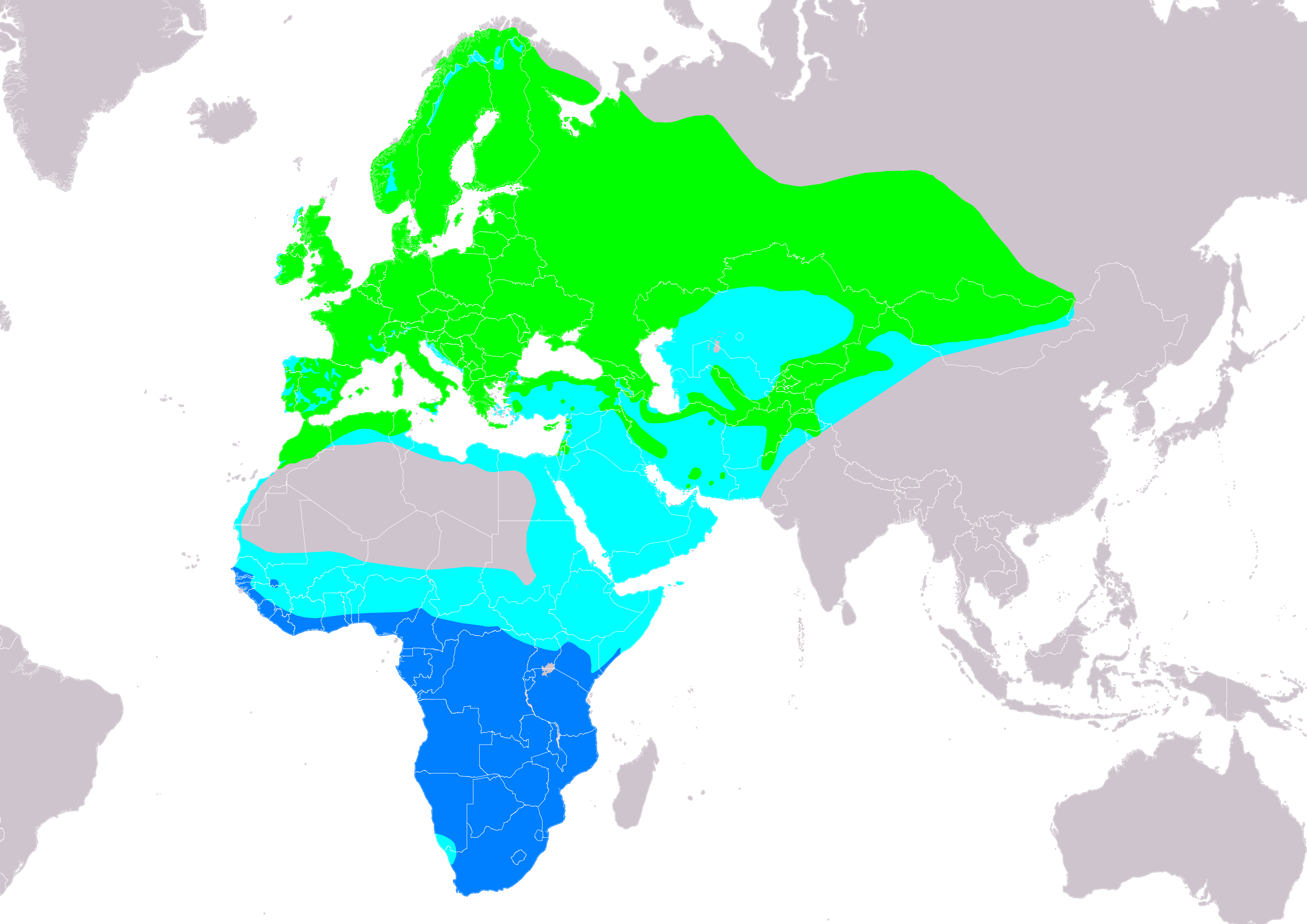
- Range of M. striata Breeding Passage Non-breeding

Synonyms
- M. grisola L.

= Spotted flycatcher =

Species of bird

The spotted flycatcher (Muscicapa striata) is a small passerine bird in the Old World flycatcher family. It breeds in most of Europe and in the Palearctic to Siberia, and is migratory, wintering in Africa and south western Asia. It is declining in parts of its range.

This is an undistinguished looking bird with long wings and tail. The adults have grey-brown upperparts and whitish underparts, with a streaked crown and breast, giving rise to the bird's common name. The legs are short and black, and the bill is black and has the broad but pointed shape typical of aerial insectivores. Juveniles are browner than adults and have spots on the upperparts.

== Taxonomy ==
The spotted flycatcher was described by the German naturalist Peter Simon Pallas in 1764 and given the binomial name Motacilla striata. The genus name Muscicapa comes from the Latin musca, a fly and capere, to catch. The specific epithet striata is from the Latin striatus meaning striated.

There are five recognised subspecies all of which winter in southern Africa. The breeding range is given below.

- M. s. striata (Pallas, 1764) – Europe to west Siberia, northwest Africa
- M. s. inexpectata Dementiev, 1932 – Crimea (southern Ukraine)
- M. s. neumanni Poche, 1904 – islands of the Aegean Sea through to the Middle East, the Caucasus, northern Iran and central Siberia
- M. s. sarudnyi Snigirewski, 1928 – eastern Iran and Turkmenistan to the mountains of central Asia and north Pakistan
- M. s. mongola Portenko, 1955 – Mongolia and south-central Siberia

Two other subspecies were previously recognised, M. s. tyrrhenica and M. s. balearica. However, a molecular phylogenetic study published in 2016 found that they were genetically similar to each other but significantly different from the other spotted flycatcher subspecies. The authors proposed that these insular subspecies should be considered as a separate species. The International Ornithologists' Union has split the species and it is known as the Mediterranean flycatcher, while other taxonomic authorities still consider it to be conspecific.

== Description ==
The spotted flycatcher is a small slim bird, around 14.5 cm (5.7 in) in length, with a weight of 14–20 g (0.49–0.71 oz). It has dull grey-brown upperparts and off-white underparts. The crown, throat and breast are streaked with brown while the wings and tail feathers are edged with paler thin margins. The subspecies M. s. tyrrhenica has paler and warmer plumage on the upperparts, with more diffuse markings on the head and breast. The sexes are alike. Juveniles have ochre-buff spots above and scaly brown spots below.

== Behaviour and ecology ==
Spotted flycatchers hunt from conspicuous perches, making sallies after passing flying insects, and often returning to the same perch. Their upright posture is characteristic.

Most passerines moult their primary flight feathers in sequence beginning near the body and proceeding outwards along the wing. The spotted flycatcher is unusual in replacing the outer flight feathers before those nearer the body.

The flycatcher's call is a thin, drawn out soft and high pitched tssssseeeeeppppp, slightly descending in pitch.

=== Breeding ===
They are birds of deciduous woodlands, parks and gardens, with a preference for open areas amongst trees. They build an open nest in a suitable recess, often against a wall, and will readily adapt to an open-fronted nest box. 4–6 eggs are laid.

Most European birds cannot discriminate between their own eggs and those of other species. The exception to this are the hosts of the common cuckoo, which have had to evolve this skill as a protection against that nest parasite. The spotted flycatcher shows excellent egg recognition, and it is likely that it was once a host of the cuckoo, but became so good at recognising the intruder's eggs that it ceased to be victimised. A contrast to this is the dunnock, which appears to be a recent cuckoo host, since it does not show any egg discrimination.

== Predation ==
A study conducted at two different locations in southern England found that one third of nests were predated. The Eurasian jay (Garrulus glandarius) was the most common aerial predator, consuming both eggs and chicks. The domestic cat (Felis catus) predated a small fraction of the nests.

== Gallery ==
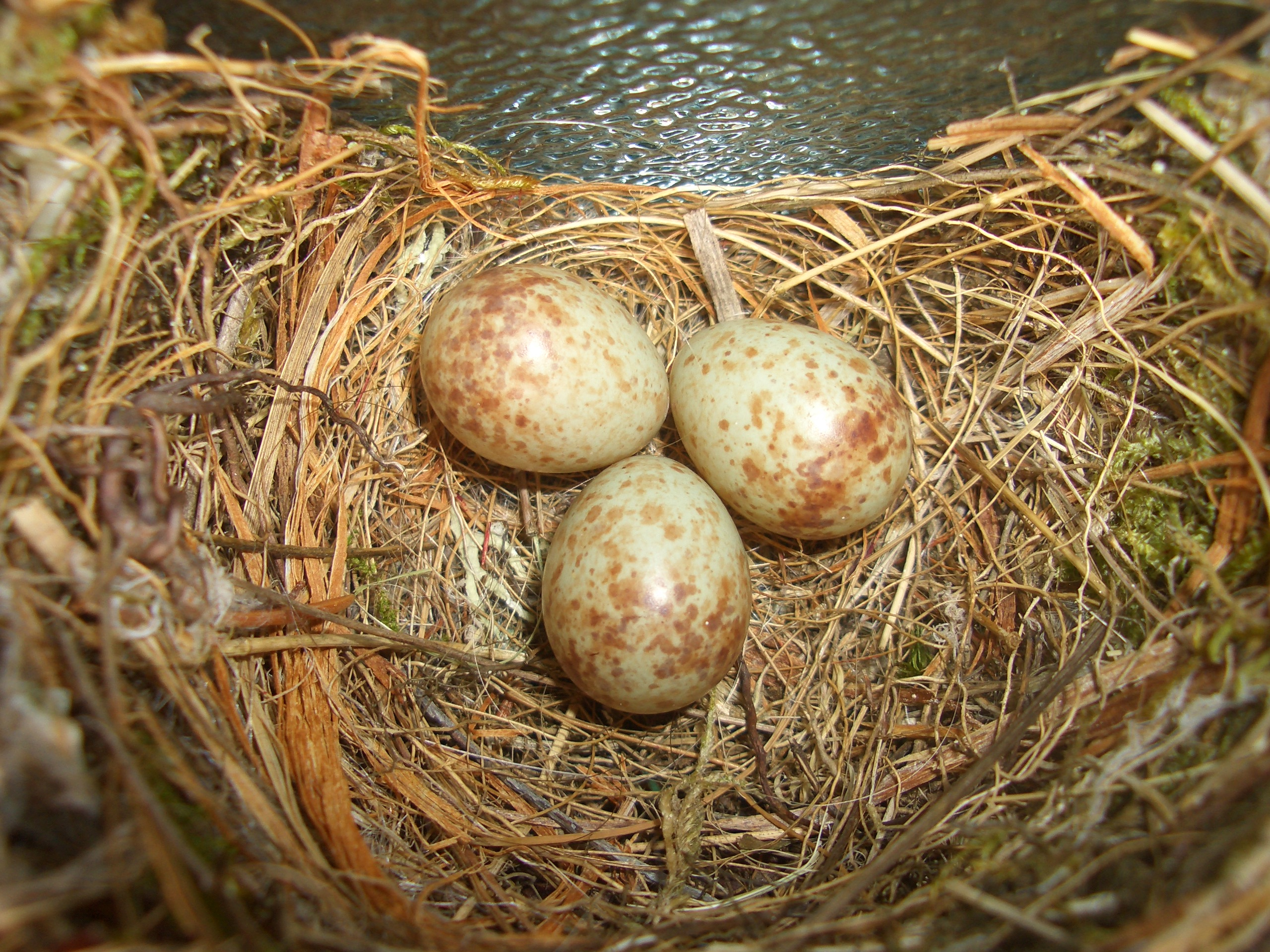
Clutch

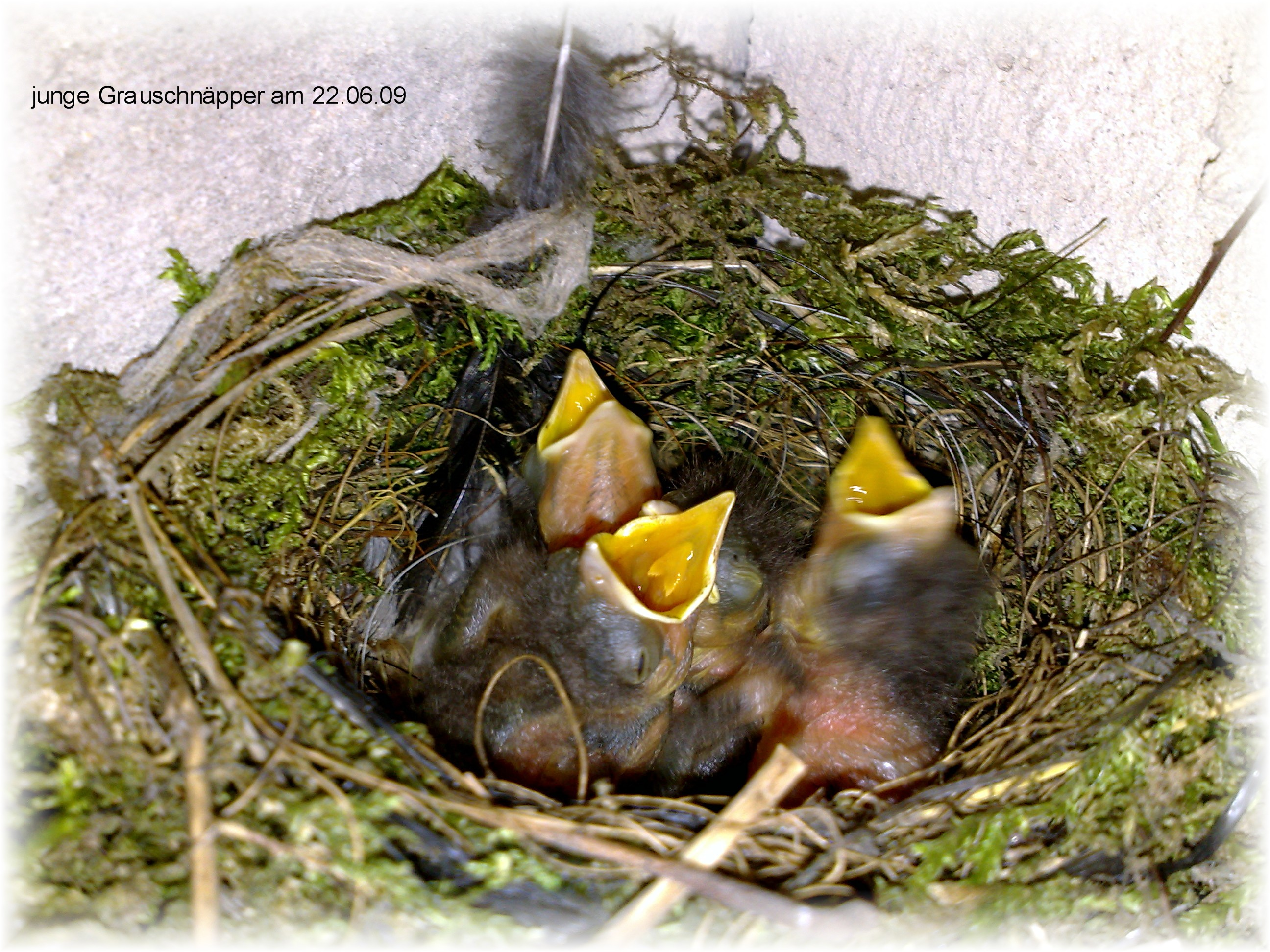
Spotted flycatcher nest.

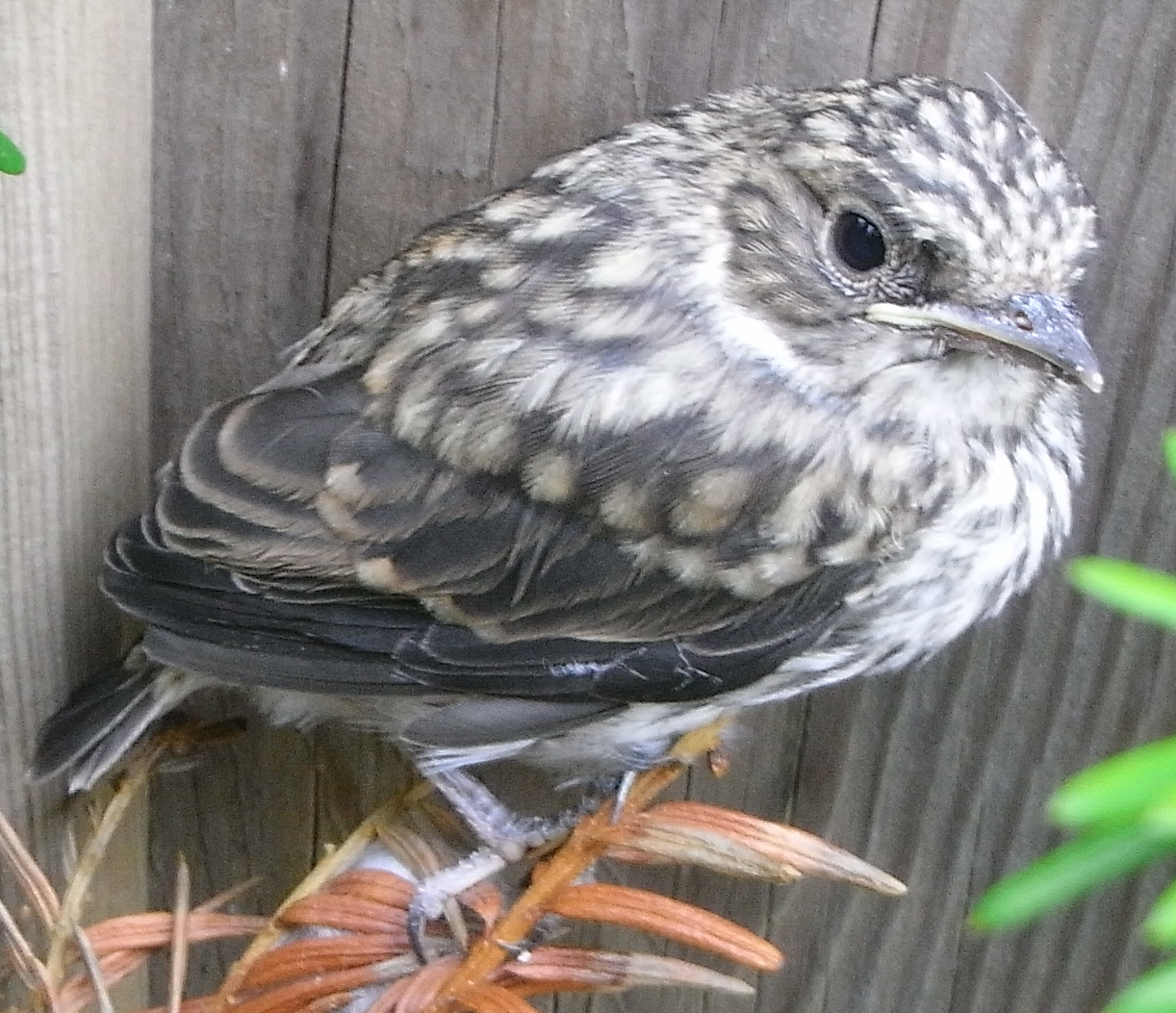
A juvenile flycatcher shortly after leaving the nest.

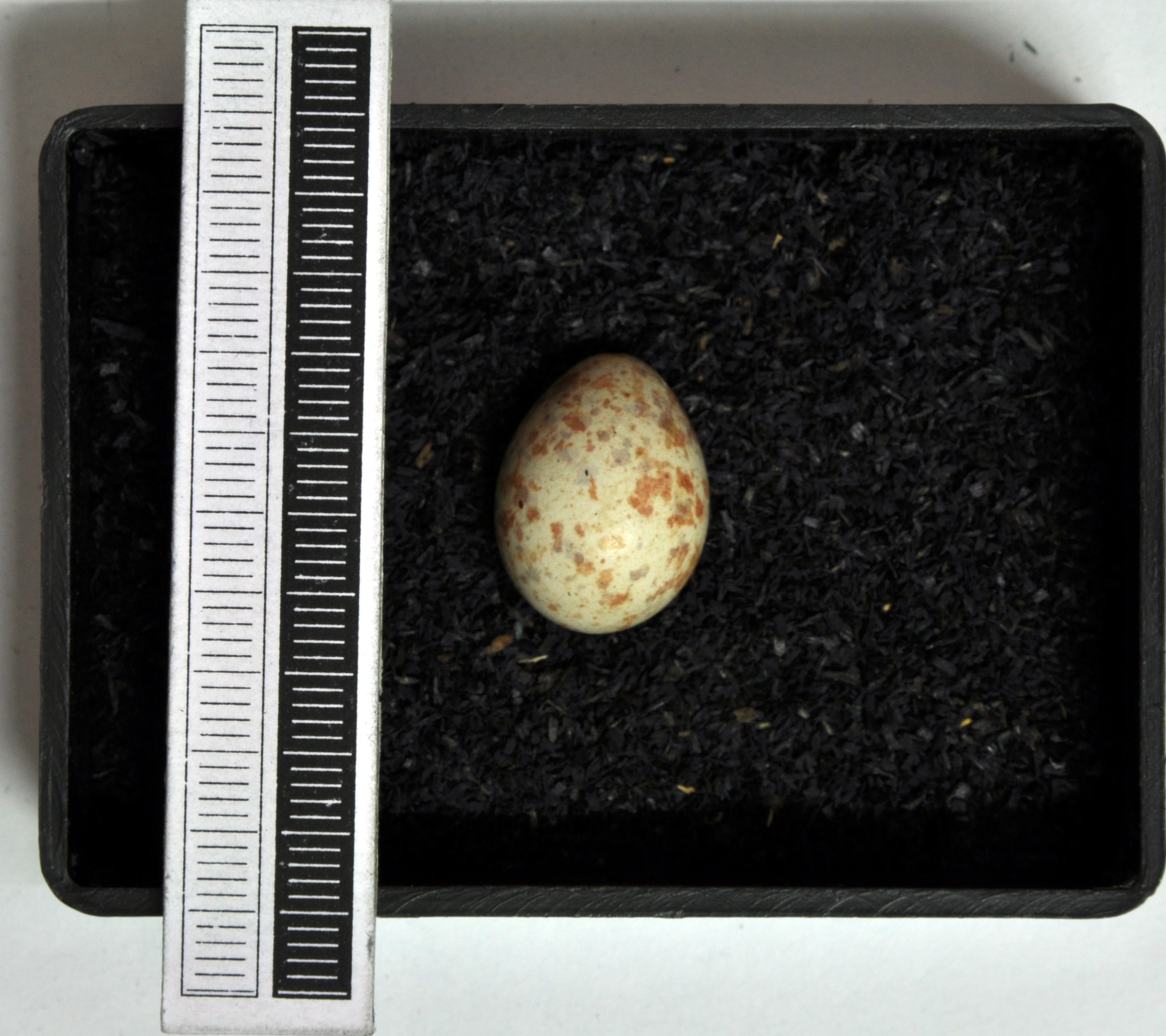
Egg, Collection Museum Wiesbaden

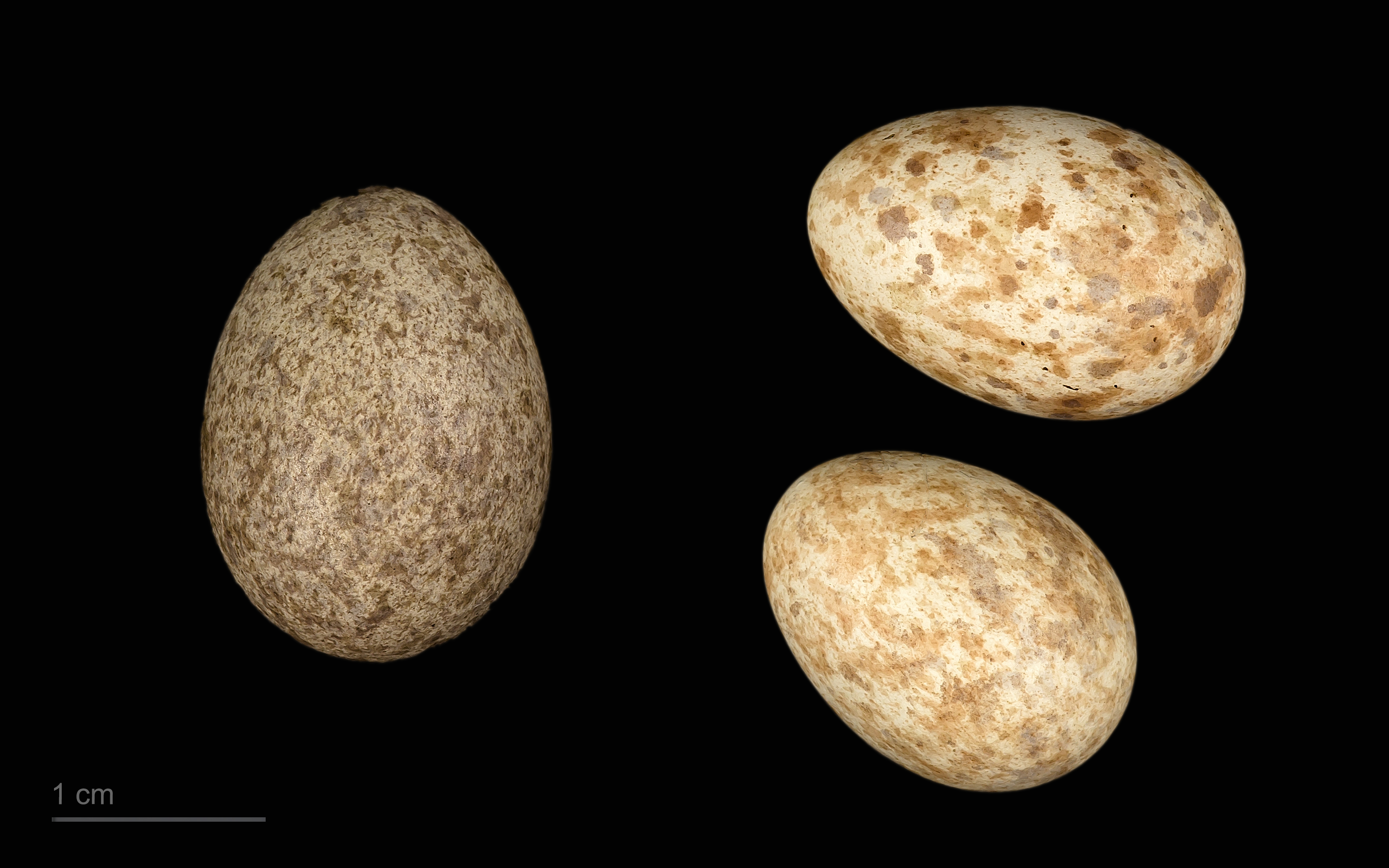
Cuculus canorus canorus in a clutch of Muscicapa striata - MHNT

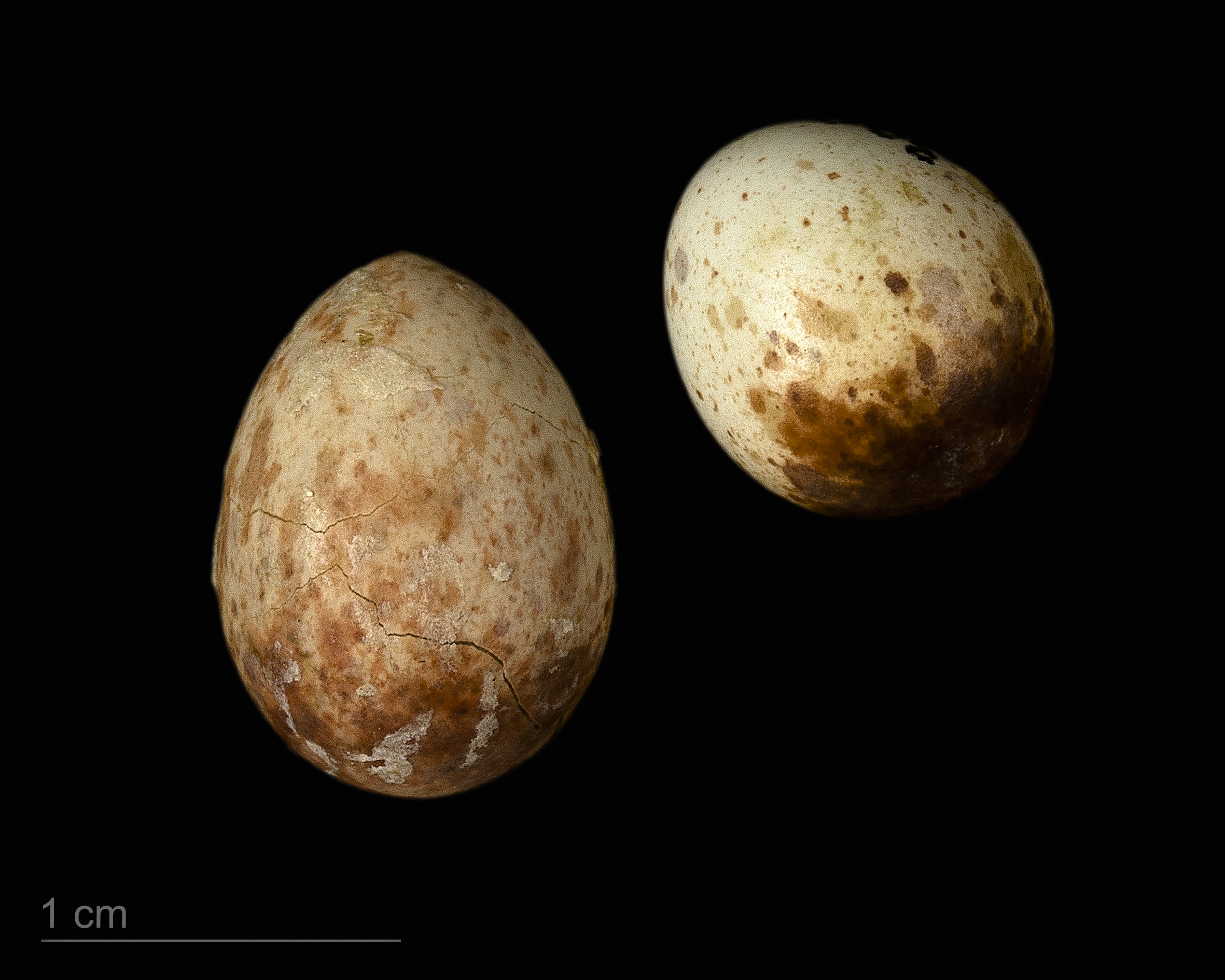
Muscicapa striata striata - MHNT
