= H. hastata =

H. hastata may refer to:

- Hakea hastata, a shrub species in the genus Hakea
- Huara hastata, Forster & Wilton, 1973, a spider species in the genus Huara found in New Zealand
- Huperzia hastata, a species of plant endemic to Ecuador

== Synonyms ==
- Hasteola hastata, a synonym for Parasenecio hastatus, a plant species

== See also ==
- Hastata (disambiguation)
