= Grey hornbill =

Grey hornbill may refer to one of several distinct species of hornbills:

- African grey hornbill, Tockus nasutus
- Malabar grey hornbill, Ocyceros griseus
- Indian grey hornbill, Ocyceros birostris
- Sri Lanka grey hornbill, Ocyceros gingalensis
