= Kanneliya–Dediyagala–Nakiyadeniya =

Sri Lankan forest complex

- Location within Sri Lanka
- Location: Southern Province, Sri Lanka
- Nearest city: Galle
- Coordinates: 6°11′N 80°25′E
- Area: 10,139 ha (25,050 acres)
- Established: 2004
- Governing body: Department of Forest Conservation

Kanneliya–Dediyagala–Nakiyadeniya or KDN is a forest complex in southern Sri Lanka. The forest complex was designated as a biosphere reserve in 2004 by UNESCO. The KDN complex is the last large remaining rainforest in Sri Lanka other than Sinharaja. This forest area has been identified as one of the floristically richest areas in South Asia. The forest complex is situated 35 km northwest of city of Galle. The rain forest is a major catchment area for two of the most important rivers in southern Sri Lanka, the Gin and Nilwala Rivers. This biosphere reserve harbors many plants and animal species endemic to Sri Lanka.

== Physical features ==
The biosphere consists series of parallel mountain ranges and valleys. The elevation ranges from 60 m to 425 m above sea level. Mean annual temperature is 27.0 °C while annual temperature variation is 4 °C-5 °C. The forest receives a substantial rainfall of 3,750 mm. Many ancient taxonomic groups of Gondwana are present in these rain forests. They also relates to Indomalayan plants and animals.

== Hydrological features ==
The forest complex act as an important catchment area for many rivers and streams flow through the area. The forest is the source for Gin River, which flows west to the forest and for Nilwala river which flows east to the forest. Kanneli, Nanikiththa and Udugama are the smaller streams of Kanneliya while Homa dola and Gal bandi dola are sourced by Nakiyadeniya and Deiyagala.

== Flora ==
The KDN forest complex shows a degree of floral endemicity, as 17 percent of lowland endemic floral species are confined to this forest area. Of 319 woody plants recorded in the area, about 52 per cent is endemic. The vegetation of KDN complex represents Sri Lanka lowland rain forests. The floral communities dominated by Shorea-Dipterocarpus-Mesua (Sinhalese "Doona-Hora-Na") are common in emergent layer of the forest.

Numerous medicinal plants are found in these forests. They include Coscinium fenestratum (Sinhalese "Weniwelgata"), Salacia reticulata ("Kothala Himbutu"), and Tinospora cordifolia ("Rasakinda"). Lycopodium squarrosum ("Kuda hadaya"), and Lycopodium phlegmaria ("Maha hadaya") are among the rare plants the forest complex harbors. The near-threatened Palaquium hinmolpedda ("Hinmolpedda") is also found here.

== Fauna ==
Some 220 faunal species recorded from the KDN forests and forests around the KDN. This includes 41 endemic species. The forest complex is home to 86 species mammals. This includes 4 species of shrews, 5 rodents, one carnivore and 2 primates. Out of 26 endemic birds of Sri Lanka, 20 of them can be seen in KDN forest complex. Sri Lanka spurfowl, Sri Lanka junglefowl, Sri Lanka grey hornbill, red-faced malkoha, orange-billed babbler, Sri Lanka blue magpie are some of them. 20 percent of Sri Lanka's endemic freshwater fishes inhabit in the waters of Gin River and Nilwala River, which sourced by the springs of Kanneliya–Dediyagala–Nakiyadeniya. Among the forests' herpetofauna are 36 species of snakes, 17 endemic species belonging to 6 families. A total of 23 species of lizards recorded in these rain forests.

== Human imprint and conservation ==
10,000 people live in 78 villages around the forest complex. Forestry, collection of non-timber products, rice cultivation, tea, rubber and cinnamon plantations, animal husbandry and other forms of agriculture and cottage industries are main economic activities take place around the forest. Nugegoda, Rajagala and Dediyagala hermitages situated within the forest. The forest complex was subjected to logging, until suspending in 1988. Fortunately the diversity of species and plants remains largely intact. A forest corridor between Sinharaja Forest Reserve and the KDN forest complex is being planned for facilitate animal movement between the two forests. Green-billed coucal, Sri Lanka blue magpie, ashy-headed laughingthrush and white-faced starling are the bird species listed as endangered. 27 percent of floral species are listed vulnerable, and 45 percent are in the rare plants category.

== See also ==
- Protected areas of Sri Lanka
