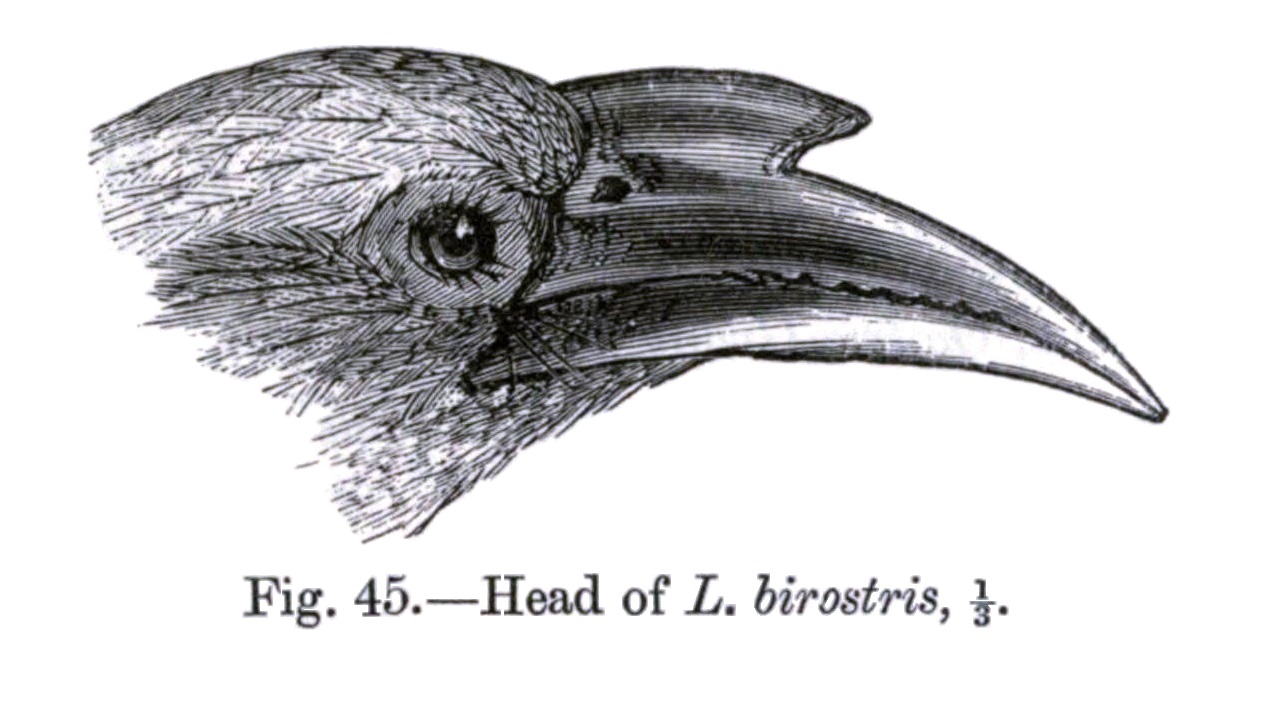
- Head of Indian grey hornbill, woodcut from The Fauna of British India, Including Ceylon and Burma

Scientific classification
- Kingdom: Animalia
- Phylum: Chordata
- Class: Aves
- Order: Bucerotiformes
- Family: Bucerotidae
- Genus: Ocyceros; Hume, 1873

Type species
- Buceros birostris Scopoli, 1786

Species
- O. birostris; O. gingalensis; O. griseus

= Ocyceros =

Genus of birds

Ocyceros is a genus of birds in the family Bucerotidae. Established by Allan Octavian Hume in 1873, it contains several species that are limited to the Indian subcontinent.

== Description ==
Hornbills in the genus Ocyceros are small Asian birds with curved triangular bills and grey plumage. As such, they are often called "grey hornbills". They have black and grey eye rings and their eyes are usually dark with black irises. All of the species have different coloured bills: the Indian grey hornbill has a dark greyish bill, the Sri Lanka grey hornbill has a pale yellowish bill, and the Malabar grey hornbill has a more yellowish orange bill.

== Species ==
The genus contains three species:

Image	Scientific name	Common name	Distribution
	Ocyceros griseus	Malabar grey hornbill	Western Ghats and associated hills of southern India
	Ocyceros gingalensis	Sri Lanka grey hornbill	Sri Lanka
	Ocyceros birostris	Indian grey hornbill	India
