= Phlegmariurus ascendens =

Conservation status
- Vulnerable (IUCN 3.1)

Scientific classification
- Kingdom: Plantae
- Clade: Tracheophytes
- Clade: Lycophytes
- Class: Lycopodiopsida
- Order: Lycopodiales
- Family: Lycopodiaceae
- Genus: Phlegmariurus
- Species: P. ascendens

Binomial name
- Phlegmariurus ascendens (Nessel) B.Øllg.

Synonyms
- Huperzia ascendens (Nessel) Holub; Urostachys ascendens Herter ex Nessel (nom. inval.)

Species of spore-bearing plant

Phlegmariurus ascendens is a species of plant in the family Lycopodiaceae. It is endemic to Ecuador. Its natural habitat is subtropical or tropical high-altitude grassland. It is threatened by habitat loss.
