= Phlegmariurus loxensis =

Conservation status
- Endangered (IUCN 3.1)

Scientific classification
- Kingdom: Plantae
- Clade: Tracheophytes
- Clade: Lycophytes
- Class: Lycopodiopsida
- Order: Lycopodiales
- Family: Lycopodiaceae
- Genus: Phlegmariurus
- Species: P. loxensis

Binomial name
- Phlegmariurus loxensis (B.Øllg.) B.Øllg.

Synonyms
- Huperzia loxensis B.Øllg.

Species of spore-bearing plant

Phlegmariurus loxensis is a species of plant in the family Lycopodiaceae. It is endemic to Ecuador, where it occurs in the páramo and forests of the Andes. It is threatened by fire in its habitat.
