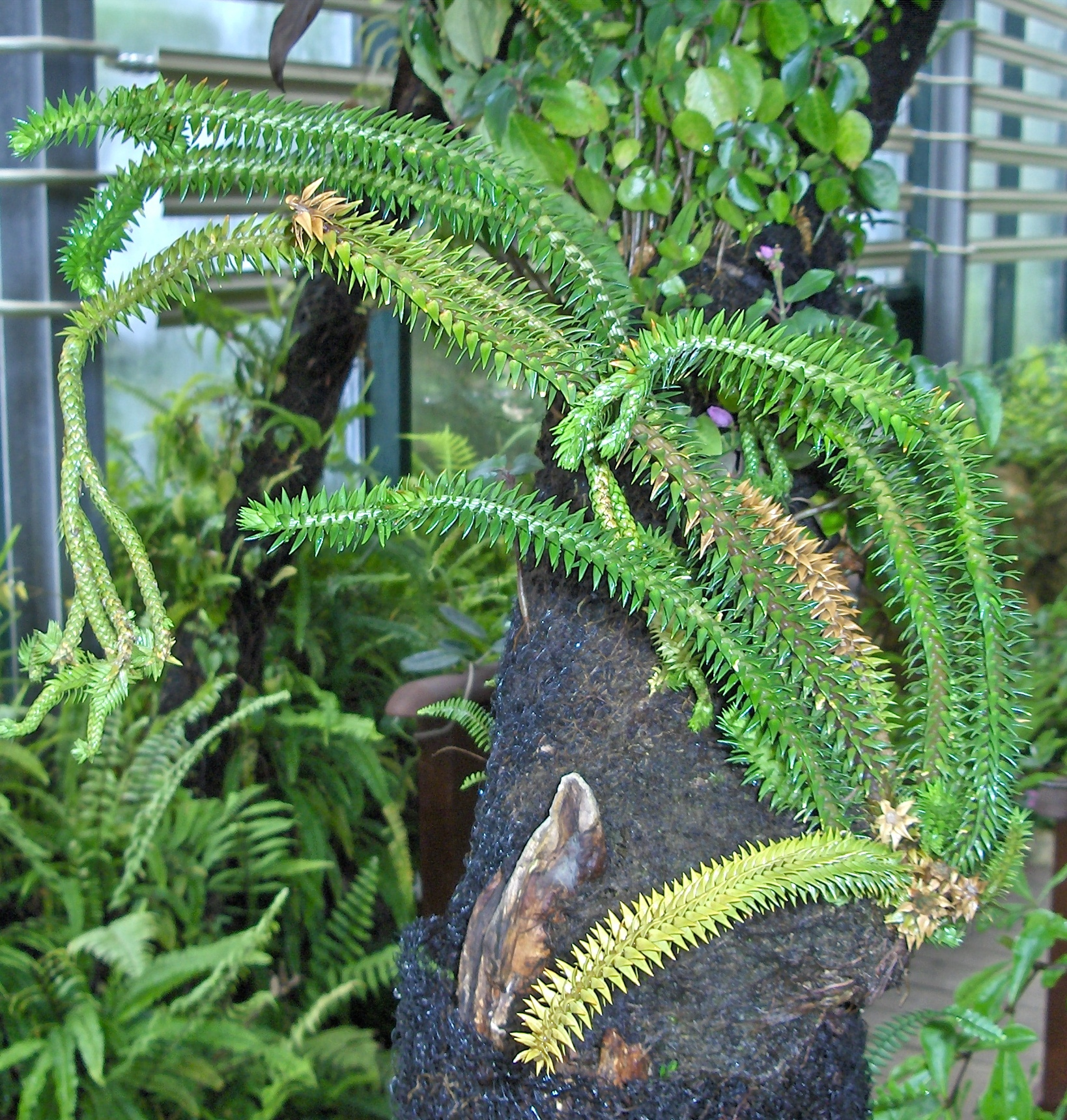

Scientific classification
- Kingdom: Plantae
- Clade: Tracheophytes
- Clade: Lycophytes
- Class: Lycopodiopsida
- Order: Lycopodiales
- Family: Lycopodiaceae
- Genus: Phlegmariurus
- Species: P. megastachyus

Binomial name
- Phlegmariurus megastachyus (Baker) A.R.Field & Bostock

Synonyms
- Huperzia megastachya (Baker) Tardieu; Lycopodium megastachyum Baker; Urostachys megastachyus (Baker) Herter ex Nessel

= Phlegmariurus megastachyus =

Species of spore-bearing plant

Phlegmariurus megastachyus is a species of firmoss (genus Huperzia) found exclusively in Madagascar.
