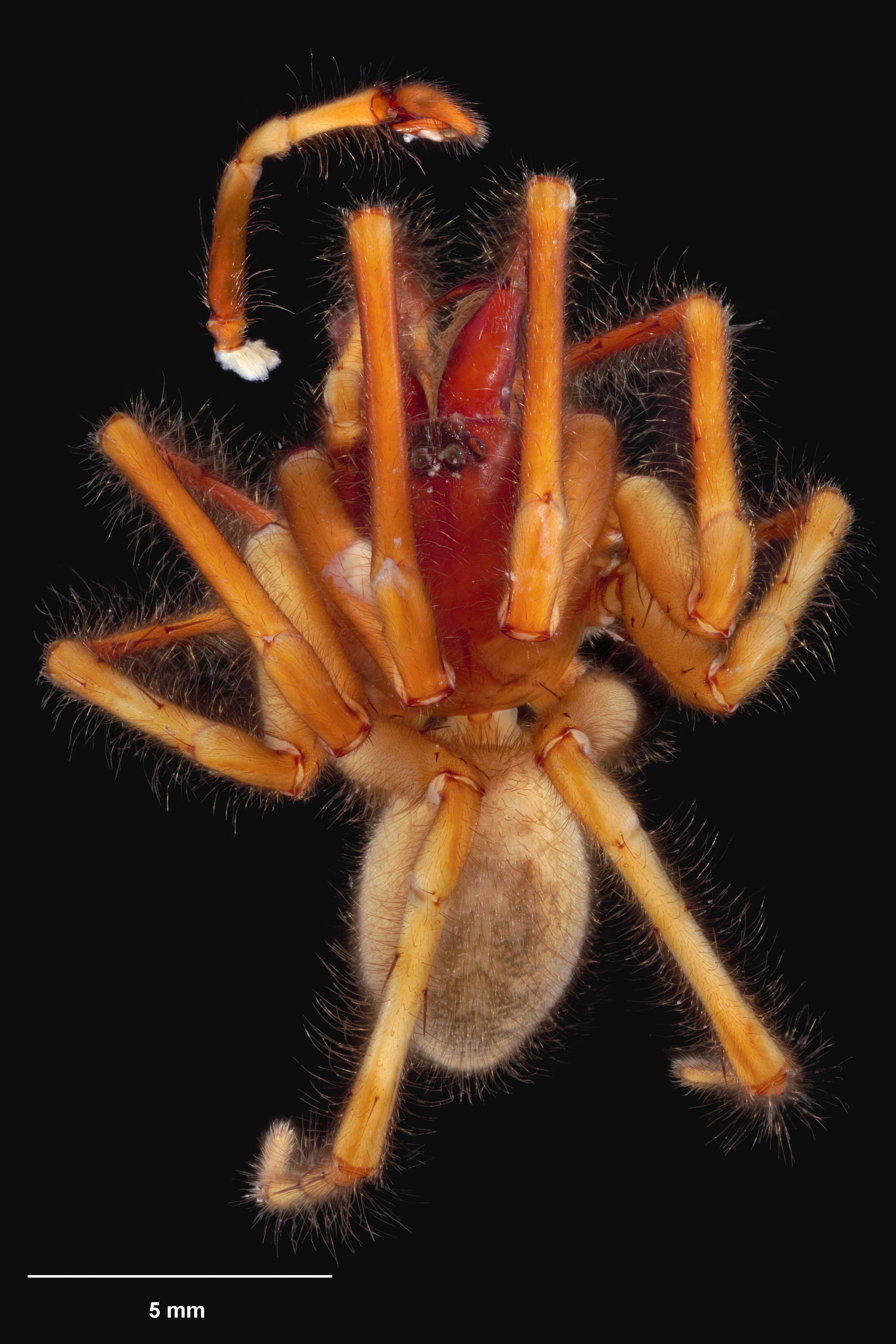

Conservation status
- Naturally Uncommon (NZ TCS)

Scientific classification
- Kingdom: Animalia
- Phylum: Arthropoda
- Subphylum: Chelicerata
- Class: Arachnida
- Order: Araneae
- Infraorder: Araneomorphae
- Family: Desidae
- Genus: Huara
- Species: H. grossa

Binomial name
- Huara grossa Forster, 1964

= Huara grossa =

Species of spider

Huara grossa is a species of Desidae that is endemic to New Zealand.

== Taxonomy ==
This species was described by Ray Forster in 1964 from female and male specimens. It was most recently revised in 1973. The holotype is stored in Te Papa Museum under registration number AS.000035.

== Description ==
The female is recorded at 17.19mm in length whereas the male is 12.33mm. The cephalothorax is coloured deep reddish brown. The legs are reddish brown. The abdomen is yellow brown with grey shading.

== Distribution ==
This species is only known from the Auckland Islands, New Zealand.

== Conservation status ==
Under the New Zealand Threat Classification System, this species is listed as "Naturally Uncommon" with the qualifiers of "Island Endemic" and "Range Restricted".
