= Phlegmariurus talpiphilus =

Conservation status
- Vulnerable (IUCN 3.1)

Scientific classification
- Kingdom: Plantae
- Clade: Tracheophytes
- Clade: Lycophytes
- Class: Lycopodiopsida
- Order: Lycopodiales
- Family: Lycopodiaceae
- Genus: Phlegmariurus
- Species: P. talpiphilus

Binomial name
- Phlegmariurus talpiphilus (B.Øllg.) B.Øllg.

Synonyms
- Huperzia talpiphila B.Øllg.

Species of spore-bearing plant

Phlegmariurus talpiphilus is a species of plant in the family Lycopodiaceae. It is endemic to Ecuador. Its natural habitat is subtropical or tropical high-altitude grassland. It is threatened by habitat loss.
