= Phlegmariurus nutans =

Conservation status
- Critically Endangered (IUCN 3.1)

- Critically Imperiled (NatureServe)

Scientific classification
- Kingdom: Plantae
- Clade: Tracheophytes
- Clade: Lycophytes
- Class: Lycopodiopsida
- Order: Lycopodiales
- Family: Lycopodiaceae
- Genus: Phlegmariurus
- Species: P. nutans

Binomial name
- Phlegmariurus nutans (Brack.) W.H.Wagner

Synonyms
- Huperzia nutans (Brack.) Rothm.; Lycopodium nutans Brack.; Urostachys nutans (Brack.) Herter ex Nessel

Species of spore-bearing plant

Phlegmariurus nutans, synonym Huperzia nutans, known as wawaeʻiole or nodding clubmoss, is a species of club moss in the family Lycopodiaceae. It is endemic to wet forests and cliffside shrublands on the islands of Oahu and Kauai in Hawaii. It is threatened by habitat loss.
