= Phlegmariurus mannii =

Conservation status
- Critically Imperiled (NatureServe)

Scientific classification
- Kingdom: Plantae
- Clade: Tracheophytes
- Clade: Lycophytes
- Class: Lycopodiopsida
- Order: Lycopodiales
- Family: Lycopodiaceae
- Genus: Phlegmariurus
- Species: P. mannii

Binomial name
- Phlegmariurus mannii (Hillebr.) W.H.Wagner

Synonyms
- Huperzia mannii (Hillebr.) Holub; Lycopodium mannii (Hillebr.) Skottsb.; Lycopodium phlegmaria var. mannii Hillebr.

Species of spore-bearing plant

Phlegmariurus mannii, synonym Huperzia mannii, is a species of lycopod, known by the common names Mann's clubmoss and wawaeʻiole. It is endemic to Hawaii, where there are only six populations remaining. It is a federally listed endangered species of the United States.

This plant is an epiphyte which grows upon other plants, especially koa (Acacia koa), ʻolapa (Cheirodendron trigynum), and kawaʻu (Ilex anomala). It has a hanging, branching, reddish stem no more than 10 centimetres (3.9 in) long. Each branch has three longitudinal rows of toothlike leaves. When reproducing, the plant produces a branching fruiting spike which may be up to 20 centimetres (7.9 in) long.

Today the plant is known from just a few occurrences on the islands of Maui and Hawaii. It is historically known from Kauai, but it may be extirpated there. Its survival is threatened by habitat damage caused by feral pigs, cattle, and Introduced plant species, as well as its low population.
