= Huara ovalis =

Conservation status
- Naturally Uncommon (NZ TCS)

Scientific classification
- Domain: Eukaryota
- Kingdom: Animalia
- Phylum: Arthropoda
- Subphylum: Chelicerata
- Class: Arachnida
- Order: Araneae
- Infraorder: Araneomorphae
- Family: Desidae
- Genus: Huara
- Species: H. ovalis

Binomial name
- Huara ovalis (Hogg, 1909)

Synonyms
- Myro ovalis

Species of spider

Huara ovalis is a species of Desidae that is endemic to New Zealand.

== Taxonomy ==
This species was described as Myro ovalis by Henry Roughton Hogg in 1909 from male and female specimens. It was most recently revised in 1973. The lectotype is stored in Otago Museum.

== Description ==
This species is recorded at 5mm in length.

== Distribution ==
This species is only known from Snares Islands, New Zealand.

== Conservation status ==
Under the New Zealand Threat Classification System, this species is listed as "Naturally Uncommon" with the qualifiers of "Island Endemic" and "One Location".
