= Phlegmariurus compactus =

Conservation status
- Vulnerable (IUCN 3.1)

Scientific classification
- Kingdom: Plantae
- Clade: Tracheophytes
- Clade: Lycophytes
- Class: Lycopodiopsida
- Order: Lycopodiales
- Family: Lycopodiaceae
- Genus: Phlegmariurus
- Species: P. compactus

Binomial name
- Phlegmariurus compactus (Hook.) B.Øllg.

Synonyms
- Huperzia compacta (Hook.) Trevis.; Huperzia jamesonii (Baker) Holub; Lycopodium compactum Hook.; Lycopodium jamesonii Baker; Urostachys compactus (Hook.) Nessel; Urostachys jamesonii (Baker) Nessel

Species of spore-bearing plant

Phlegmariurus compactus is a species of plant in the family Lycopodiaceae. It is endemic to Ecuador, where it is distributed throughout the southern Andean páramos. It occurs up to 4500 meters in altitude.
