= Phlegmariurus cumingii =

Conservation status
- Least Concern (IUCN 3.1)

Scientific classification
- Kingdom: Plantae
- Clade: Tracheophytes
- Clade: Lycophytes
- Class: Lycopodiopsida
- Order: Lycopodiales
- Family: Lycopodiaceae
- Genus: Phlegmariurus
- Species: P. cumingii

Binomial name
- Phlegmariurus cumingii (Nessel) B.Øllg.

Synonyms
- Huperzia cumingii (Nessel) Holub; Lycopodium cumingii (Nessel) Rolleri; Urostachys cumingii Nessel

Species of spore-bearing plant

Phlegmariurus cumingii is a species of plant in the family Lycopodiaceae. It is endemic to Ecuador. Its natural habitats are subtropical or tropical moist montane forest and subtropical or tropical high-altitude grassland.
