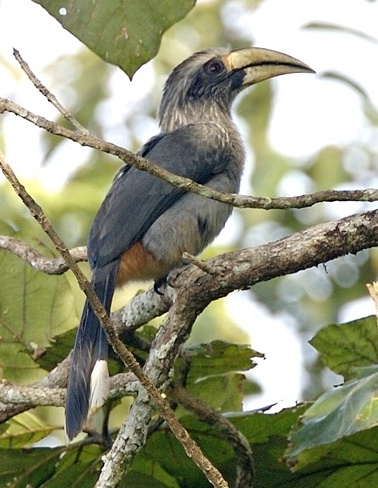

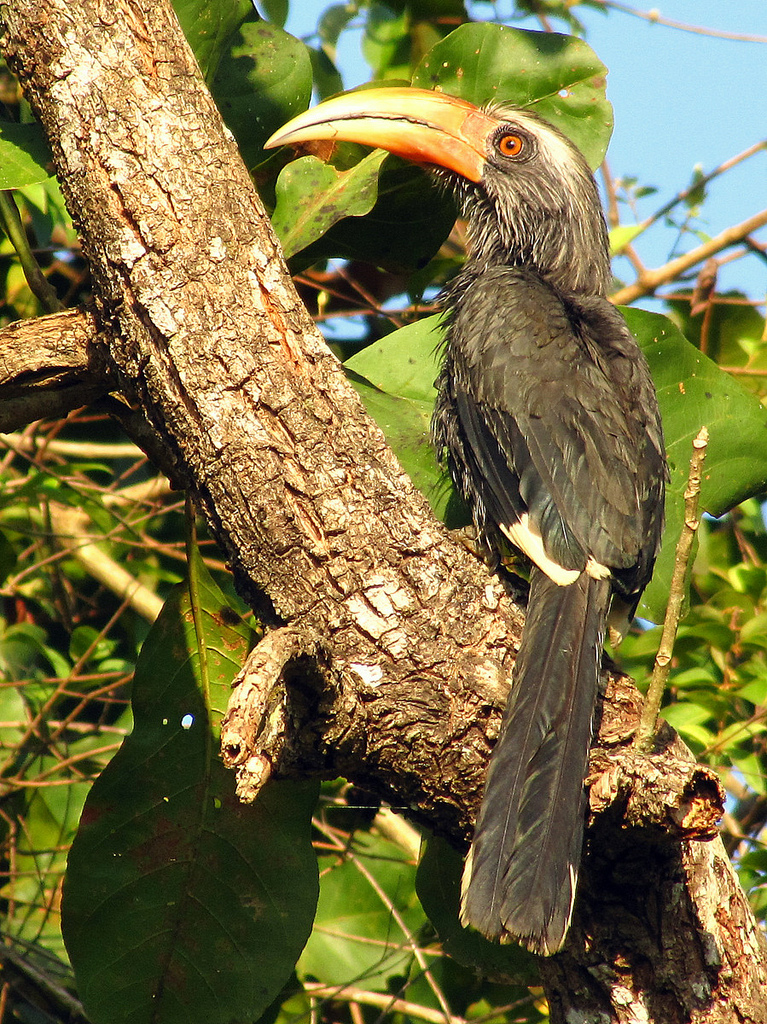
- A female (top) with dark base to the lower mandible, and a male (below), both in Kerala, India

Conservation status
- Vulnerable (IUCN 3.1)

Scientific classification
- Kingdom: Animalia
- Phylum: Chordata
- Class: Aves
- Order: Bucerotiformes
- Family: Bucerotidae
- Genus: Ocyceros
- Species: O. griseus

Binomial name
- Ocyceros griseus (Latham, 1790)
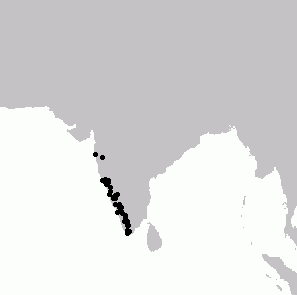
- ● recorded locations

Synonyms
- Tockus griseus Lophoceros griseus

= Malabar grey hornbill =

Species of bird

The Malabar gray hornbill (Ocyceros griseus) is a hornbill endemic to the Western Ghats and associated hills of southern India. They have a large beak but lack the casque that is prominent in some other hornbill species. They are found mainly in dense forest and around rubber, arecanut or coffee plantations. They move around in pairs or small groups, feeding on figs and other forest fruits. Their loud cackling and laughing call makes them familiar to people living in the region.

== Description ==
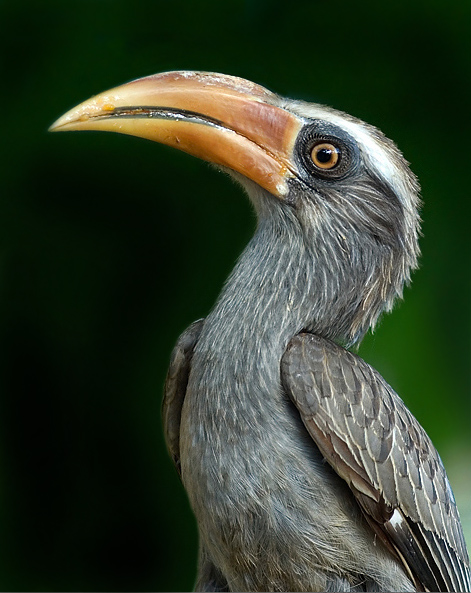
An adult male

The Malabar grey hornbill is a large bird, but at 45 to 58 cm (18 to 23 in) in length it is still the smallest of the Asian hornbills. It has a 23 cm (9.1 in) tail and pale or yellowish to orange bill. Males have a reddish bill with a yellow tip, while the females have a plain yellow bill with black at the base of the lower mandible and a black stripe along the culmen. They show a broad whitish superciliary band above the eye, running down to the neck. They fly with a strong flap and glide flight and hop around heavily on the outer branches of large fruiting trees. They have brown-grey wings, a white carpal patch and black primary flight feathers tipped with white. The Indian grey hornbill, which is found mainly on the adjoining plains, is easily told apart by its prominent casque, and in flight by the white trailing edge of the entire wing. The Malabar grey hornbill has a grey back and a cinnamon vent. The long tail is blackish with a white tip, and the underparts are grey with white streaks. The long curved bill has no casque. Immature birds have browner upperparts and a yellow bill. Young birds have a dull white or yellow iris.

Their loud calls are distinctive and include "hysterical cackling", "laughing" and "screeching" calls.

== Local names ==
சோலைக் காகா (solai kaka, Tamil, meaning forest crow); சராட்டான் (sarattaan, Kadar); செரியன் ஓங்கல் (seriyan oongal, Muthuvan, meaning small hornbill); ಕಲ್ದಲ್ ಹಕ್ಕಿ (kaldal hakki, Kannada), കോഴിവേഴാമ്പൽ (kozhi vezhambal, Malayalam), chotta peelu or dhanesh in Marathi, and gobre vaayre in Konkani.

Cackle calls

Screeches

== Distribution ==
The species is endemic to the Western Ghats mountain range of India from about Nashik in the north to the southernmost hills. The species has an elevational distribution range from about 50 m near the coast (e.g., Phansad Wildlife Sanctuary, Maharashtra) to around 1,500 m in the mountains. In the southern Western Ghats, Malabar Grey Hornbills were reported in evergreen forests between 500 m and 900 m (sporadically to 1,100 m) elevation in Kalakad – Mundanthurai Tiger Reserve, but frequently up to 1,200 m in the Anamalai Hills further north. In both these sites, the estimated Malabar Grey Hornbill density decreased with elevation, with the population density in rainforest fragments in the Anamalai Hills being additionally positively related to food tree species richness. The species is found mainly in dense forest habitats; the thinner dry forest habitat of the plains is typically occupied by the Indian grey hornbill. The Sri Lanka grey hornbill was included with this species in the past, but is now considered distinct.

=== Behaviour and ecology ===
This hornbill is found in small groups mainly in habitats with good tree cover. Being large frugivores, they are important as seed dispersal agents for many species of fruit bearing forest trees. They also feed on small vertebrates and in captivity they will readily take meat.

=== Breeding ===
Molem, Goa, India Nov 1997

The breeding season is January to May. Being secondary cavity nesters (incapable of excavating their own nests), they find trees with large cavities. A study in the Anaimalai Hills showed that the species preferred nest sites that had large trees. The nest holes were usually found in large trees with hollows caused by heart-rot, where a branch had broken off. Trees of the species Lagerstroemia microcarpa, Terminalia bellirica and Terminalia crenulata were found to hold nearly 70% of all the nests in the Mudumalai area. The species is monogamous, and the same nest sites are used by the pair year after year. The female incarcerates herself within the cavity by sealing its entrance with a cement made from her droppings. The female then lays three or sometimes four white eggs and begins a complete moult of her flight feathers. The entrance to the nest retains a narrow aperture through which the female voids excreta and receives food from the male. The male brings all the food needed for the female and the young. Berries, insects, small rodents and reptiles are included in the diet. Males tap the tree to beckon the female on arriving with food. Berries are regurgitated one at a time and shifted to the tip of the bill before being passed to the female.

== Gallery ==
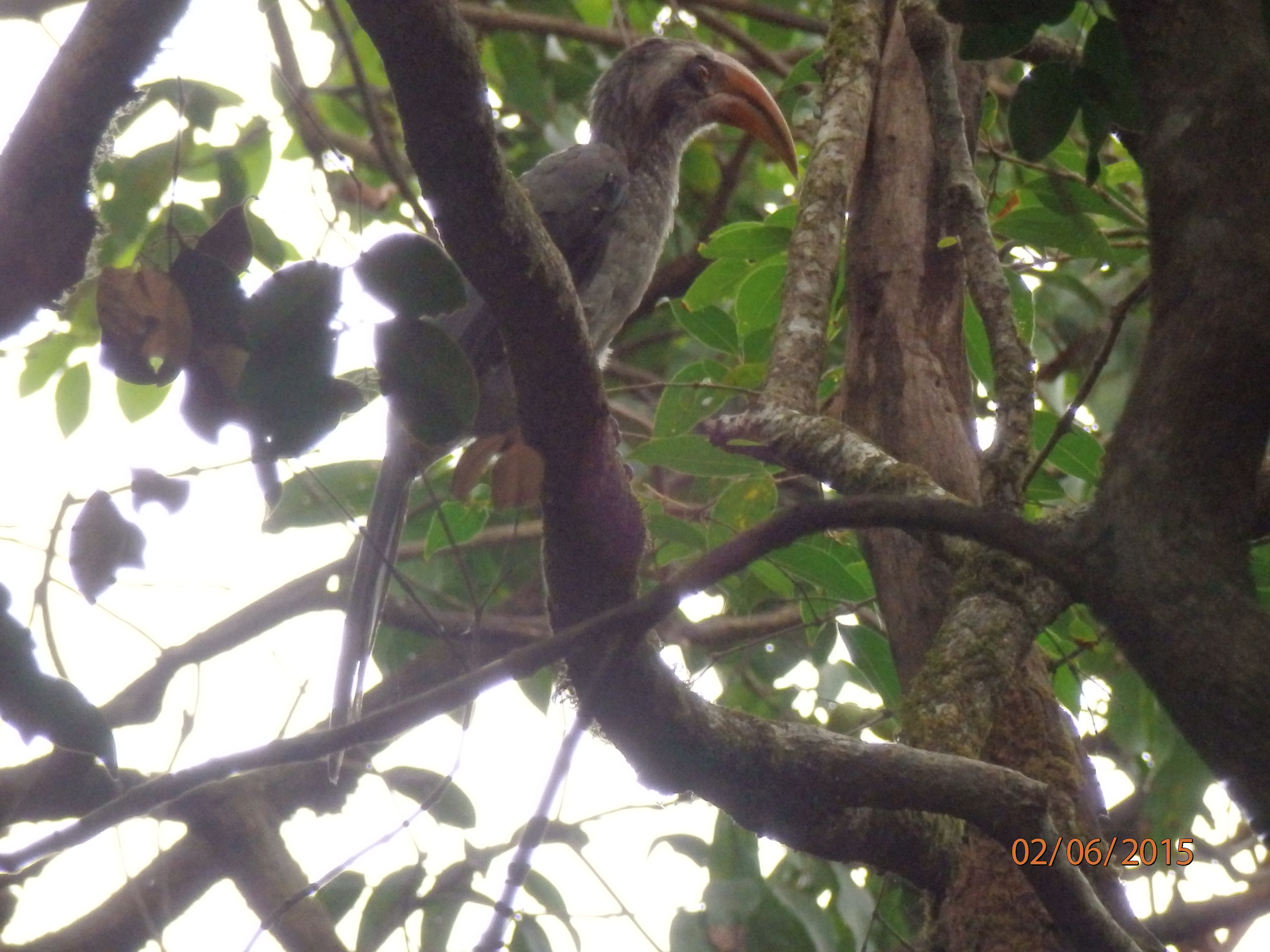
Malbar Grey Hornbill at Amba, Maharashtra, India
