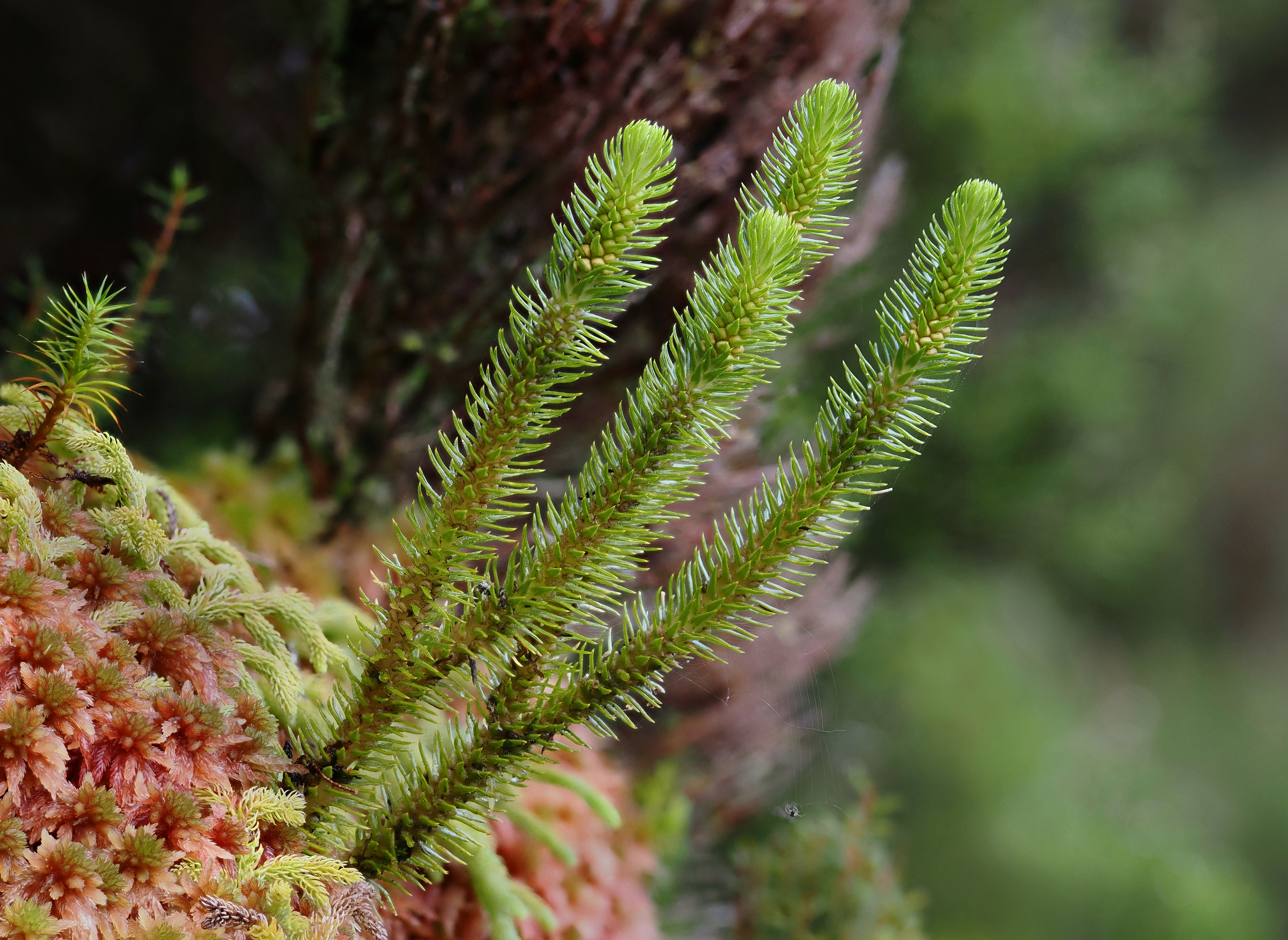
- P. dentatus photographed on Terceira

Conservation status
- Least Concern (IUCN 3.1)

Scientific classification
- Kingdom: Plantae
- Clade: Tracheophytes
- Clade: Lycophytes
- Class: Lycopodiopsida
- Order: Lycopodiales
- Family: Lycopodiaceae
- Genus: Phlegmariurus
- Species: P. dentatus

Binomial name
- Phlegmariurus dentatus (Herter) Arana

Synonyms
- Lycopodium dentatum Herter; Urostachys dentatus (Herter) Herter ex Nessel; Huperzia selago subsp. dentata (Herter) Valentine; Huperzia dentata (Herter) Holub

= Phlegmariurus dentatus =

Species of flowering plant

Phlegmariurus dentatus is a species of plant in the family Lycopodiaceae that is endemic to the Portuguese archipelagos of the Azores and Madeira.

== Distribution and habitat ==
P. dentatus is widespread in the Azores and may be found on the islands of São Miguel, Terceira, São Jorge, Pico, Faial, Flores and Corvo. It is less common in Madeira, occurring only on Madeira Island. It can be found growing on damp and sheltered slopes, in gullies, on banks above levadas, and at the edges of roads and forests at elevations of 200–2,300 m (660–7,550 ft) above sea level.

== Description ==
P. dentatus is a stout, upright lycophyte growing to 41 cm (16 in) tall. The leaves are linear-lanceolate in shape, measuring approximately 9 mm (0.35 in) by 1.2 mm (0.047 in), with toothed margins. Stomata are present only on the underside of leaves. It branches dichotomously and lacks gemmae.
