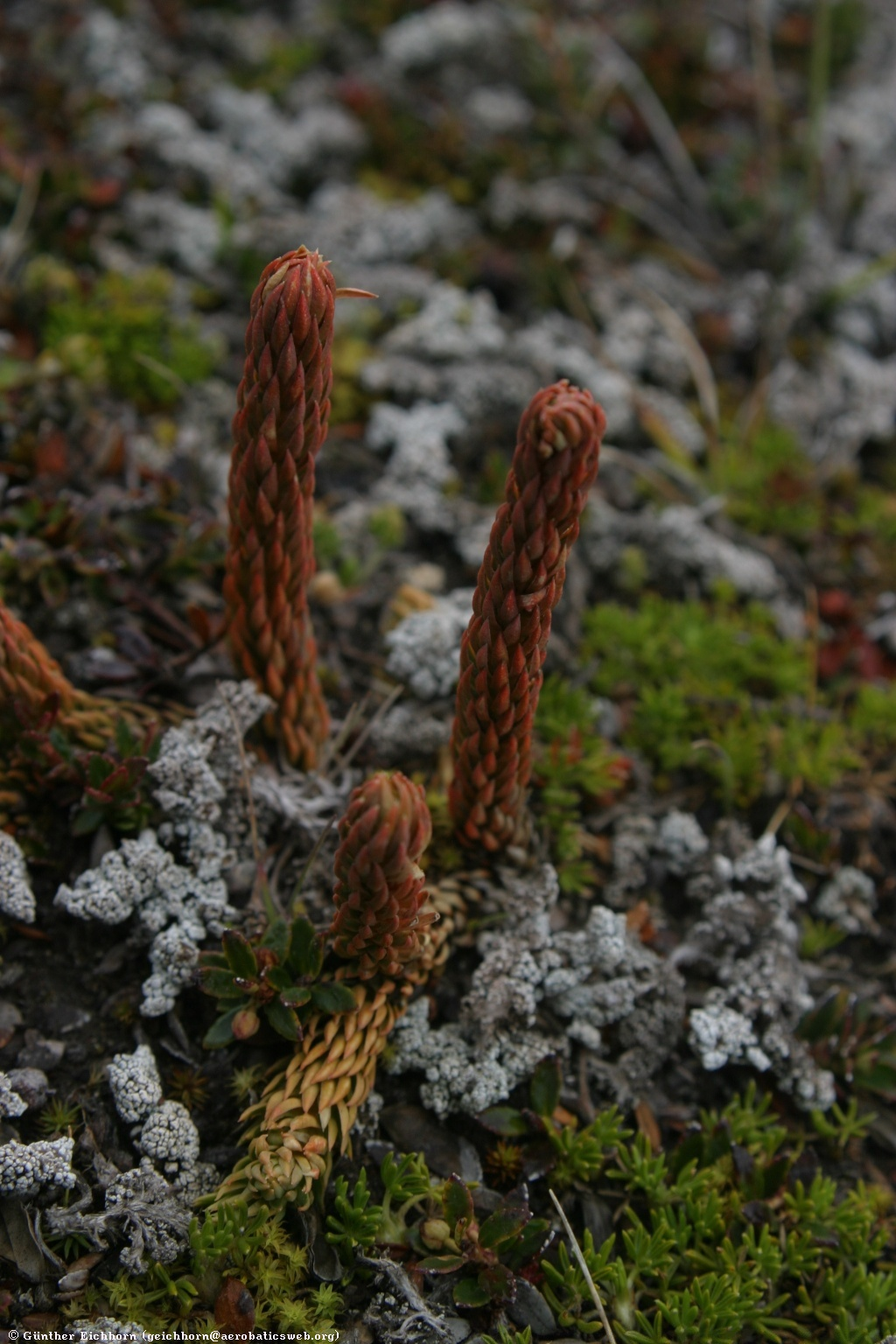
- Huperzia crassa on Cotopaxi, Ecuador

Scientific classification
- Kingdom: Plantae
- Clade: Tracheophytes
- Clade: Lycophytes
- Class: Lycopodiopsida
- Order: Lycopodiales
- Family: Lycopodiaceae
- Genus: Phlegmariurus
- Species: P. crassus

Binomial name
- Phlegmariurus crassus (Humb. & Bonpl. ex Willd.) B.Øllg.

Synonyms
- Huperzia crassa (Humb.& Bonpl. ex Willd.) Rothm.; Huperzia erythraea (Spring) Trevis.; Huperzia pilgeriana (Herter ex Nessel) Holub; Huperzia springii (Herter ex Nessel) Holub; Lycopodium bonae-voluntatis (Herter) C.V.Morton; Lycopodium crassum Humb.& Bonpl. ex Willd.; Lycopodium erythraeum Spring; Lycopodium nesselianum Duek & Lellinger; Lycopodium saururus var. crassum (Humb.& Bonpl.ex Willd.) Sodiro; Urostachys bonae-voluntatis Herter; Urostachys crassus (Humb.& Bonpl.ex Willd.) Herter ex Nessel; Urostachys erythraeus (Spring) Herter ex Nessel; Urostachys kupperi Nessel; Urostachys orionis Herter; Urostachys pilgerianus Herter ex Nessel; Urostachys springii (Klotzsch & H.Karst.) Herter ex Nessel

= Phlegmariurus crassus =

Species of spore-bearing plant

Phlegmariurus crassus is a lycophyte found in Central and South America.

== Distribution ==
It is found from Hispaniola and Mexico south through South America to Paraguay.
