= Huara pudica =

Conservation status
- Data Deficient (NZ TCS)

Scientific classification
- Kingdom: Animalia
- Phylum: Arthropoda
- Subphylum: Chelicerata
- Class: Arachnida
- Order: Araneae
- Infraorder: Araneomorphae
- Family: Desidae
- Genus: Huara
- Species: H. pudica

Binomial name
- Huara pudica Forster & Wilton, 1973

Species of spider

Huara pudica is a species of intertidal spider that is endemic to New Zealand.

== Taxonomy ==
This species was described by Ray Forster and Cecil Wilton in 1973 from male and female specimens. The holotype is stored in Otago Museum.

== Description ==
The male is recorded at 3mm in length whereas the female is length isn't given. The carapace is coloured pale yellow. The legs are banded. The abdomen is creamy with black shading patches.

== Distribution ==
This species is only known from Canterbury, New Zealand.

== Conservation status ==
Under the New Zealand Threat Classification System, this species is listed as "Data Deficient" with the qualifiers of "Data Poor: Size" and "Data Poor: Trend".
