= Huara marplesi =

Conservation status
- Not Threatened (NZ TCS)

Scientific classification
- Kingdom: Animalia
- Phylum: Arthropoda
- Subphylum: Chelicerata
- Class: Arachnida
- Order: Araneae
- Infraorder: Araneomorphae
- Family: Desidae
- Genus: Huara
- Species: H. marplesi

Binomial name
- Huara marplesi Forster & Wilton, 1973

Species of spider

Huara marplesi is a species of Desidae that is endemic to New Zealand.

== Taxonomy ==
This species was described by Ray Forster and Cecil Wilton in 1973 from male specimens. The holotype is stored in Otago Museum.

== Description ==
The male is recorded at 2.84mm in length. The carapace is coloured pale yellow and has brown bands dorsally. The legs are pale yellow. The abdomen is creamy and has dark shading laterally.

== Distribution ==
This species is only known from Westland, New Zealand.

== Conservation status ==
Under the New Zealand Threat Classification System, this species is listed as "Not Threatened".
