= Huara antarctica =

Conservation status
- Naturally Uncommon (NZ TCS)

Scientific classification
- Domain: Eukaryota
- Kingdom: Animalia
- Phylum: Arthropoda
- Subphylum: Chelicerata
- Class: Arachnida
- Order: Araneae
- Infraorder: Araneomorphae
- Family: Desidae
- Genus: Huara
- Species: H. antarctica

Binomial name
- Huara antarctica (Berand, 1931)

Synonyms
- Gohia antarctica; Chiracanthium antarcticum

Species of spider

Huara antarctica is a species of Desidae that is endemic to New Zealand.

== Taxonomy ==
This species was described as Gohia antarctica by Lucien Berland in 1931 from male and female specimens. It was most recently revised in 1973. The holotype is stored in Canterbury Museum.

== Description ==
This species is recorded at 10mm in length.

== Distribution ==
This species is only known from the Auckland Islands, New Zealand.

== Conservation status ==
Under the New Zealand Threat Classification System, this species is listed as "Naturally Uncommon" with the qualifiers of "Island Endemic" and "Range Restricted".
