= Phlegmariurus llanganatensis =

Conservation status
- Vulnerable (IUCN 3.1)

Scientific classification
- Kingdom: Plantae
- Clade: Tracheophytes
- Clade: Lycophytes
- Class: Lycopodiopsida
- Order: Lycopodiales
- Family: Lycopodiaceae
- Genus: Phlegmariurus
- Species: P. llanganatensis

Binomial name
- Phlegmariurus llanganatensis B.Øllg.

Synonyms
- Huperzia llanganatensis B.Øllg.

Species of spore-bearing plant

Phlegmariurus llanganatensis is a species of plant in the family Lycopodiaceae. It is endemic to Ecuador. Its natural habitat is subtropical or tropical high-altitude grassland. It is threatened by habitat loss.

This species is native to:

- Ecuador

No other species is listed as such.
