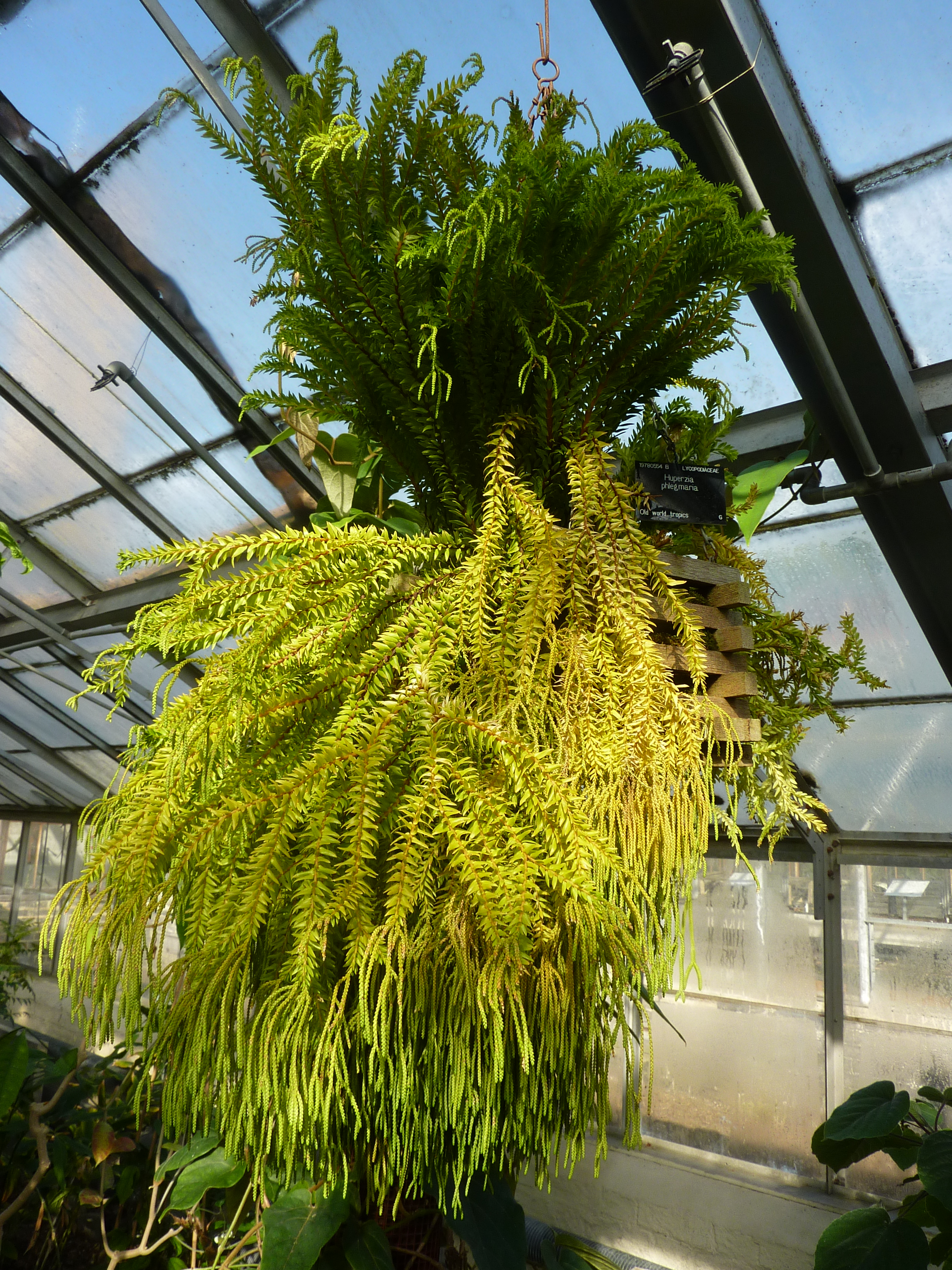
- Phlegmariurus phlegmaria growing in the Cambridge University Botanic Garden

Scientific classification
- Kingdom: Plantae
- Clade: Tracheophytes
- Clade: Lycophytes
- Class: Lycopodiopsida
- Order: Lycopodiales
- Family: Lycopodiaceae
- Subfamily: Huperzioideae
- Genus: Phlegmariurus (Herter) Holub

Species
- See text.

= Phlegmariurus =

Genus of spore-bearing plants

Phlegmariurus is a genus of lycophyte plants in the family Lycopodiaceae. The genus is recognized in the Pteridophyte Phylogeny Group classification of 2016 (PPG I), but not by some other sources, which keep it in a broadly defined Huperzia.

== Taxonomy ==
The genus was first described in 1909 by Wilhelm Herter as the section Phlegmariurus of the genus Lycopodium. The section was elevated to a genus by Josef Ludwig Holub in 1964.

Within the family Lycopodiaceae, Phlegmariurus is placed in the subfamily Huperzioideae. A phylogenetic study in 2016, employing both molecular and morphological data, concluded that either a one-genus or a three-genus division of the subfamily produced monophyletic taxa. The authors preferred the three-genus division, recognizing Huperzia, Phlegmariurus and Phylloglossum. Their preferred hypothesis for the relationships of the three genera was:

- Huperzioideae
  - - Phylloglossum
    - Huperzia
  - Phlegmariurus

The majority of the species formerly placed in a broadly defined Huperzia belong in Phlegmariurus. However, the genera are difficult to separate morphologically, and others have preferred the one-genus division of the subfamily.

=== Species ===
As of June 2024, the Checklist of Ferns and Lycophytes of the World accepted over 300 species:

- Phlegmariurus acerosus (Sw.) B.Øllg.
- Phlegmariurus acifolius (Rolleri) B.Øllg.
- Phlegmariurus acutus (Rolleri) B.Øllg.
- Phlegmariurus affinis (Trevis.) B.Øllg.
- Phlegmariurus afromontanus Pic. Serm.
- Phlegmariurus ambrensis (Rakotondr.) A.R.Field & Bauret
- Phlegmariurus amentaceus (B.Øllg.) B.Øllg.
- Phlegmariurus andinus (Rosenst.) B.Øllg.
- Phlegmariurus aqualupianus (Spring) B.Øllg.
- Phlegmariurus arcuatus (B.Øllg.) B.Øllg.
- Phlegmariurus aristei (Nessel) B.Øllg.
- Phlegmariurus ascendens (Nessel) B.Øllg.
- Phlegmariurus attenuatus (Spring) B.Øllg.
- Phlegmariurus australis (Willd.) A.R.Field
- Phlegmariurus austroecuadoricus (B.Øllg.) B.Øllg.
- Phlegmariurus austrosinicus (Ching) Li Bing Zhang
- Phlegmariurus axillaris (Roxb.) comb. ined., currently Huperzia axillaris (Roxb.) Rothm.
- Phlegmariurus badinianus (B.Øllg. & P.G.Windisch) B.Øllg.
- Phlegmariurus balansae (Herter) A.R.Field & Bostock
- Phlegmariurus bampsianus (Pic. Serm.) A.R.Field & Bostock
- Phlegmariurus banayanicus (Herter) A.R.Field & Bostock
- Phlegmariurus beitelii (B.Øllg.) B.Øllg.
- Phlegmariurus biformis (Hook.) B.Øllg.
- Phlegmariurus billardierei (Spring) Trevis.
- Phlegmariurus binervius (Herter) B.Øllg.
- Phlegmariurus bolanicus (Rosenst.) A.R.Field & Bostock
- Phlegmariurus brachiatus (Maxon) B.Øllg.
- Phlegmariurus brachystachys (Baker) A.R.Field & Bostock
- Phlegmariurus bradeorum (Christ) B.Øllg.
- Phlegmariurus brevifolius (Hook. & Grev.) B.Øllg.
- Phlegmariurus brongniartii (Spring) B.Øllg.
- Phlegmariurus callitrichifolius (Mett.) B.Øllg.
- Phlegmariurus campianus (B.Øllg.) B.Øllg.
- Phlegmariurus cancellatus (Spring) Ching
- Phlegmariurus capellae (Herter) B.Øllg.
- Phlegmariurus capillaris (Sodiro) B.Øllg.
- Phlegmariurus carinatus (Poir.) Ching
- Phlegmariurus catacachiensis (Nessel) B.Øllg.
- Phlegmariurus cavifolius (C.Chr.) A.R.Field & Bostock
- Phlegmariurus chamaeleon (Herter) B.Øllg.
- Phlegmariurus changii T.Y.Hsieh
- Phlegmariurus chiricanus (Maxon) B.Øllg.
- Phlegmariurus christii (Silveira) B.Øllg.
- Phlegmariurus ciliatospiculatus B.Øllg.
- Phlegmariurus ciliolatus (B.Øllg.) B.Øllg.
- Phlegmariurus cleefianus (B.Øllg.) B.Øllg.
- Phlegmariurus cocouyensis B.Øllg.
- Phlegmariurus colanensis (B.Øllg.) B.Øllg.
- Phlegmariurus columnaris (B.Øllg.) B.Øllg.
- Phlegmariurus comans (Herter ex Nessel) B.Øllg.
- Phlegmariurus compactus (Hook.) B.Øllg.
- Phlegmariurus copelandianus (R.C.Y.Chou & Bartlett) A.R.Field
- Phlegmariurus coralium (Spring) A.R.Field & Bostock
- Phlegmariurus crassus (Humb. & Bonpl. ex Willd.) B.Øllg.
- Phlegmariurus creber (Alderw.) A.R.Field & Bostock
- Phlegmariurus crucis-australis (Herter) B.Øllg.
- Phlegmariurus cruentus (Spring) B.Øllg.
- Phlegmariurus cryptomerinus (Maxim.) Satou
- Phlegmariurus cuernavacensis (Underw. & F.E.Lloyd) B.Øllg.
- Phlegmariurus cumingii (Nessel) B.Øllg.
- Phlegmariurus cuneifolius (Hieron.) B.Øllg.
- Phlegmariurus cunninghamioides (Hayata) Ching
- Phlegmariurus curiosus (Herter) A.R.Field & Bostock
- Phlegmariurus curvifolius (Kunze) B.Øllg.
- Phlegmariurus dacrydioides (Baker) A.R.Field & Bostock
- Phlegmariurus dalhousieanus (Spring) A.R.Field & Bostock
- Phlegmariurus darwinianus (Herter ex Nessel) B.Øllg.
- Phlegmariurus delbrueckii (Herter) A.R.Field & Bostock
- Phlegmariurus deminuens (Herter) B.Øllg.
- Phlegmariurus dentatus (Herter) Arana
- Phlegmariurus dianae (Herter) B.Øllg.
- Phlegmariurus dichaeoides (Maxon) B.Øllg.
- Phlegmariurus dichotomus (Jacq.) W.H.Wagner
- Phlegmariurus dielsii (Herter) A.R.Field & Bostock
- Phlegmariurus divergens (Alderw.) A.R.Field & Testo
- Phlegmariurus durus (Pic. Serm.) A.R.Field & Bostock
- Phlegmariurus echinatus (Spring) B.Øllg.
- Phlegmariurus ellenbeckii (Nessel) A.R.Field & Bostock
- Phlegmariurus elmeri (Herter) A.R.Field & Bostock
- Phlegmariurus elongatus (Lag ex Sw.), comb. ined., currently Lycopodium elongatum Lag ex Sw.
- Phlegmariurus engleri (Hieron. & Herter) B.Øllg.
- Phlegmariurus eremorum (Rolleri) B.Øllg.
- Phlegmariurus ericifolius (C.Presl) B.Øllg.
- Phlegmariurus erythrocaulos (Fée) B.Øllg.
- Phlegmariurus espinosanus (B.Øllg.) B.Øllg.
- Phlegmariurus eversus (Poir.) B.Øllg.
- Phlegmariurus fargesii (Herter) Ching
- Phlegmariurus filicaulos (Copel.) A.R.Field & Testo
- Phlegmariurus filiformis (Sw.) W.H.Wagner
- Phlegmariurus firmus (Mett.) B.Øllg.
- Phlegmariurus flagellaceus (Kuhn) A.R.Field & Bostock
- Phlegmariurus flexibilis (Fée) B.Øllg.
- Phlegmariurus foliaceus (Maxon) B.Øllg.
- Phlegmariurus foliosus (Copel.) A.R.Field & Bostock
- Phlegmariurus fontinaloides (Spring) B.Øllg.
- Phlegmariurus fordii (Baker) Ching
- Phlegmariurus friburgensis (Herter ex Nessel & Hoehne) B.Øllg.
- Phlegmariurus funiculus (Herter) comb. ined., currently Huperzia funicula (Herter) J.P.Roux
- Phlegmariurus funiformis (Cham. ex Spring) B.Øllg.
- Phlegmariurus gagnepainianus (Herter) A.R.Field & Bostock
- Phlegmariurus galapagensis (O.J.Hamann) B.Øllg.
- Phlegmariurus giganteus (Herter) A.R.Field & Bostock
- Phlegmariurus gnidioides (L. fil.) A.R.Field & Bostock
- Phlegmariurus goebelii (Nessel) A.R.Field & Bostock
- Phlegmariurus gracilis A.Rojas & R.Calderón
- Phlegmariurus guandongensis Ching
- Phlegmariurus gunturensis (Alderw.) A.R.Field & Bostock
- Phlegmariurus haeckelii (Herter) A.R.Field & Testo
- Phlegmariurus haitensis (Herter) comb. ined., currently Huperzia haitensis (Herter) Holub
- Phlegmariurus hamiltonii (Spreng.) Á.Löve & D.Löve
- Phlegmariurus harmsii (Nessel) A.R.Field & Bostock
- Phlegmariurus hartwegianus (Spring) B.Øllg.
- Phlegmariurus hastatus (B.Øllg.) B.Øllg.
- Phlegmariurus hellwigii (Warb.) A.R.Field & Bostock
- Phlegmariurus hemleri (Nessel) B.Øllg.
- Phlegmariurus henryi (Baker) Ching
- Phlegmariurus heterocarpos (Fée) B.Øllg.
- Phlegmariurus heteroclitus (Desv. ex Poir.) B.Øllg.
- Phlegmariurus hexastichus (B.Øllg. & P.G.Windisch) B.Øllg.
- Phlegmariurus hildebrandtii (Herter) A.R.Field & Bauret
- Phlegmariurus hippurideus (Christ) B.Øllg.
- Phlegmariurus hippuris (Desv. ex Poir.) A.R.Field & Testo
- Phlegmariurus hoffmannii (Maxon) B.Øllg.
- Phlegmariurus hohenackeri (Herter) B.Øllg.
- Phlegmariurus holstii (Hieron.) A.R.Field & Bostock
- Phlegmariurus homocarpus (Herter) B.Øllg.
- Phlegmariurus horizontalis (Nessel) A.R.Field & Bostock
- Phlegmariurus huberi (B.Øllg.) B.Øllg.
- Phlegmariurus hugoi B.Øllg.
- Phlegmariurus humbertii (Nessel) A.R.Field & Bostock
- Phlegmariurus humbertii-henrici (Herter) A.R.Field & Bostock
- Phlegmariurus hypogaeus (B.Øllg.) B.Øllg.
- Phlegmariurus hystrix (Herter) B.Øllg.
- Phlegmariurus idroboi B.Øllg.
- Phlegmariurus iminii Kiew
- Phlegmariurus intermedius (Trevis.) B.Øllg.
- Phlegmariurus itambensis (B.Øllg. & P.G.Windisch) B.Øllg.
- Phlegmariurus jaegeri (Herter) A.R.Field & Bostock
- Phlegmariurus josesantae B.Øllg.
- Phlegmariurus kajewskii (Copel.) A.R.Field & Testo
- Phlegmariurus killipii (Herter) B.Øllg.
- Phlegmariurus kuesteri (Nessel) B.Øllg.
- Phlegmariurus lancifolius (Maxon) B.Øllg.
- Phlegmariurus lauterbachii (E.Pritz. ex K.Schum. & Lauterb.) A.R.Field & Bostock
- Phlegmariurus lecomteanus (Nessel) A.R.Field & Bostock
- Phlegmariurus ledermannii (Herter) A.R.Field & Bostock
- Phlegmariurus lehnertii Testo
- Phlegmariurus lignosus (Herter) B.Øllg.
- Phlegmariurus lindenii (Spring) B.Øllg.
- Phlegmariurus linifolius (L.) B.Øllg.
- Phlegmariurus llanganatensis (B.Øllg.) B.Øllg.
- Phlegmariurus lockyeri (D.Jones & B.Gray) A.R.Field & Bostock
- Phlegmariurus loefgrenianus (Silveira) B.Øllg.
- Phlegmariurus longus (Copel.) A.R.Field & Bostock
- Phlegmariurus loxensis (B.Øllg.) B.Øllg.
- Phlegmariurus luteynii B.Øllg.
- Phlegmariurus macbridei (Herter) B.Øllg.
- Phlegmariurus macgregorii (Baker) A.R.Field & Bostock
- Phlegmariurus macrostachys (Hook. ex Spring) N.C.Nair & S.R.Ghosh
- Phlegmariurus magnusianus (Herter) A.R.Field & Testo
- Phlegmariurus mandiocanus (Raddi) B.Øllg.
- Phlegmariurus mannii (Hillebr.) W.H.Wagner
- Phlegmariurus marsupiiformis (D.Jones & B.Gray) A.R.Field & Bostock
- Phlegmariurus martii (Wawra) B.Øllg.
- Phlegmariurus megastachyus (Baker) A.R.Field & Bostock
- Phlegmariurus melanesicus (Brownlie) A.R.Field & Testo
- Phlegmariurus merrillii (Herter) A.R.Field & Bostock
- Phlegmariurus mesoamericanus (B.Øllg.) B.Øllg.
- Phlegmariurus mexicanus (Herter) B.Øllg.
- Phlegmariurus mildbraedii (Herter) A.R.Field & Bostock
- Phlegmariurus mingcheensis Ching
- Phlegmariurus minutifolius (Alderw.) A.R.Field & Bostock
- Phlegmariurus mirabilis (Willd.) A.R.Field & Testo
- Phlegmariurus mollicomus (Spring) B.Øllg.
- Phlegmariurus monticola Kiew
- Phlegmariurus mooreanus (Sander ex Baker) B.Øllg.
- Phlegmariurus multifarius (Alderw.) A.R.Field & Bostock
- Phlegmariurus myrsinites (Lam.) B.Øllg.
- Phlegmariurus myrtifolius (G.Forst.) A.R.Field & Bostock
- Phlegmariurus myrtuosus (Spring) B.Øllg.
- Phlegmariurus neocaledonicus (Nessel) A.R.Field & Bostock
- Phlegmariurus nesselii (Brause ex Nessel) B.Øllg.
- Phlegmariurus niligaricus (Spring) A.R.Field & Bostock
- Phlegmariurus nudus (Christ ex Nessel & Hoehne) B.Øllg.
- Phlegmariurus nummularifolius (Blume) Ching
- Phlegmariurus nutans (Brack.) W.H.Wagner
- Phlegmariurus nyalamensis (Ching & S.K.Wu) H.S.Kung & L.B.Zhang
- Phlegmariurus obovalifolius (Bonap.) A.R.Field & Testo
- Phlegmariurus obtusifolius (P.Beauv.) A.R.Field & Bostock
- Phlegmariurus ocananus (Herter) B.Øllg.
- Phlegmariurus oceanianus (Herter) A.R.Field & Bostock
- Phlegmariurus oellgaardii (A.Rojas) B.Øllg.
- Phlegmariurus oltmannsii (Herter ex Nessel) A.R.Field & Bostock
- Phlegmariurus ophioglossoides (Lam.) A.R.Field & Bostock
- Phlegmariurus orizabae (Underw. & F.E.Lloyd) B.Øllg.
- Phlegmariurus ovatifolius (Ching) W.M.Chu ex H.S.Kung & Li Bing Zhang
- Phlegmariurus pachyphyllus (Kuhn ex Herter) A.R.Field & Testo
- Phlegmariurus pachyskelos B.Øllg.
- Phlegmariurus parksii (Copel.) A.R.Field & Bostock
- Phlegmariurus patentissimus (Alderw.) A.R.Field & Bostock
- Phlegmariurus pecten (Baker) A.R.Field & Bostock
- Phlegmariurus perrierianus (Tardieu) A.R.Field & Bostock
- Phlegmariurus pflanzii (Nessel) B.Øllg.
- Phlegmariurus phlegmaria (L.) Holub
- Phlegmariurus phlegmarioides (Gaudich.) A.R.Field & Bostock
- Phlegmariurus phylicifolius (Desv. ex Poir.) B.Øllg.
- Phlegmariurus phyllanthus (Hook. & Arn.) R.D.Dixit
- Phlegmariurus picardae (Krug) B.Øllg.
- Phlegmariurus pichianus (Tardieu) A.R.Field & Bostock
- Phlegmariurus pinifolius (Trevis.) Kiew
- Phlegmariurus pithyoides (Schltdl. & Cham.) B.Øllg.
- Phlegmariurus pittieri (Christ) B.Øllg.
- Phlegmariurus podocarpensis B.Øllg.
- Phlegmariurus polycarpos (Kunze) B.Øllg.
- Phlegmariurus polycladus (Sodiro) comb. ined., currently Huperzia polyclada (Sodiro) Rolleri & Deferrari
- Phlegmariurus polydactylus (B.Øllg.) B.Øllg.
- Phlegmariurus polylepidetorum (B.Øllg.) B.Øllg.
- Phlegmariurus portoricensis (Underw. & F.E.Lloyd) comb. ined., currently Lycopodium portoricense Underw. & F.E.Lloyd
- Phlegmariurus pringlei (Underw. & F.E.Lloyd) B.Øllg.
- Phlegmariurus proliferus (Blume) A.R.Field & Bostock
- Phlegmariurus pruinosus (Hieron. & Herter) B.Øllg.
- Phlegmariurus pseudovarius (Brownlie) Rouhan & A.R.Field
- Phlegmariurus pulcherrimus (Hook. & Grev.) Á. & D.Löve
- Phlegmariurus pungentifolius (Silveira) B.Øllg.
- Phlegmariurus quadrifariatus (Bory) B.Øllg.
- Phlegmariurus recurvifolius (Rolleri) B.Øllg.
- Phlegmariurus reflexus (Lam.) B.Øllg.
- Phlegmariurus regnellii (Maxon) B.Øllg.
- Phlegmariurus ribourtii (Herter) A.R.Field & Bostock
- Phlegmariurus riobambensis (Nessel) B.Øllg.
- Phlegmariurus robustus (Klotzsch) B.Øllg.
- Phlegmariurus rosenstockianus (Herter) B.Øllg.
- Phlegmariurus rostrifolius (Silveira) B.Øllg.
- Phlegmariurus ruber (Cham. & Schltdl.) B.Øllg.
- Phlegmariurus rubricus (Herter) A.R.Field & Bostock
- Phlegmariurus rufescens (Hook.) B.Øllg.
- Phlegmariurus rupicola (Alderw.) A.R.Field & Bostock
- Phlegmariurus sagasteguianus (B.Øllg.) B.Øllg.
- Phlegmariurus salvinioides (Herter) Ching
- Phlegmariurus samoanus (Herter ex Nessel) A.R.Field & Bostock
- Phlegmariurus sarmentosus (Spring) B.Øllg.
- Phlegmariurus saururus (Lam.) B.Øllg.
- Phlegmariurus scabridus (B.Øllg.) B.Øllg.
- Phlegmariurus schlechteri (E.Pritz.) A.R.Field & Bostock
- Phlegmariurus schlimii (Herter) B.Øllg.
- Phlegmariurus schmidtchenii (Hieron.) B.Øllg.
- Phlegmariurus sellifolius (B.Øllg.) B.Øllg.
- Phlegmariurus sellowianus (Herter) B.Øllg.
- Phlegmariurus serpentiformis (Herter) B.Øllg.
- Phlegmariurus setifolius (Alderw.) A.R.Field & Bostock
- Phlegmariurus shangsiensis C.Y.Yang
- Phlegmariurus shingianus R.H.Jiang & X.C.Zhang
- Phlegmariurus sieberianus (Spring) B.Øllg.
- Phlegmariurus sieboldii (Miq.) Ching
- Phlegmariurus silveirae (Herter ex Nessel & Hoehne) B.Øllg.
- Phlegmariurus silverstonei B.Øllg.
- Phlegmariurus sintenisii (Herter) B.Øllg.
- Phlegmariurus societensis (J.W.Moore) A.R.Field
- Phlegmariurus sooianus Lawalrée
- Phlegmariurus sphagnicola B.Øllg.
- Phlegmariurus squarrosus (G.Forst.) Á. & D.Löve
- Phlegmariurus staudtii (Nessel) A.R.Field & Bostock
- Phlegmariurus stemmermanniae A.C.Medeiros & Wagner
- Phlegmariurus stephani B.Øllg.
- Phlegmariurus strictus (Baker) A.R.Field & Bostock
- Phlegmariurus subfalciformis (Alderw.) A.R.Field & Bostock
- Phlegmariurus subtubulosus (Herter) comb. ined., currently Huperzia subtubulosa (Herter) Holub
- Phlegmariurus subulatus (Desv. ex Poir.) B.Øllg.
- Phlegmariurus tafaensis (Nessel) A.R.Field & C.W.Chen
- Phlegmariurus talamancanus (B.Øllg.) B.Øllg.
- Phlegmariurus talamauanus (Alderw.) A.R.Field & Bostock
- Phlegmariurus talpiphilus (B.Øllg.) B.Øllg.
- Phlegmariurus tardieuae (Herter) A.R.Field & Testo
- Phlegmariurus tauri (Herter) A.R.Field & Testo
- Phlegmariurus taxifolius (Sm.) Á. & D.Löve
- Phlegmariurus tenuicaulis (Underw. & F.E.Lloyd) B.Øllg.
- Phlegmariurus tenuis (Humb. & Bonpl. ex Willd.) B.Øllg.
- Phlegmariurus terrae-guilelmi (Herter) A.R.Field & Bostock
- Phlegmariurus tetragonus (Hook. & Grev.) B.Øllg.
- Phlegmariurus tetrastichoides (A.R.Field & Bostock) A.R.Field & Bostock
- Phlegmariurus tetrastichus (Kunze) A.R.Field & Bostock
- Phlegmariurus tico A.Rojas
- Phlegmariurus toppingii (Herter) A.R.Field & Bostock
- Phlegmariurus tournayanus Lawalrée
- Phlegmariurus transilla (Sodiro ex Baker) B.Øllg.
- Phlegmariurus treitubensis (Silveira) B.Øllg.
- Phlegmariurus trifoliatus (Copel.) A.R.Field & Bostock
- Phlegmariurus trigonus (C.Chr.) A.R.Field & Bostock
- Phlegmariurus tryonorum B.Øllg.
- Phlegmariurus tubulosus (Maxon) B.Øllg.
- Phlegmariurus ulixis (Herter) B.Øllg.
- Phlegmariurus unguiculatus (B.Øllg.) B.Øllg.
- Phlegmariurus urbanii (Herter) B.Øllg.
- Phlegmariurus vanuatuensis A.R.Field
- Phlegmariurus varius (R.Br.) A.R.Field & Bostock
- Phlegmariurus venezuelanicus (Herter) B.Øllg.
- Phlegmariurus vernicosus (Hook. & Grev.) Á. & D.Löve
- Phlegmariurus verticillatus (L.f.) A.R.Field & Testo
- Phlegmariurus villonacensis (B.Øllg.) B.Øllg.
- Phlegmariurus warneckei (Herter ex Nessel) A.R.Field & Testo
- Phlegmariurus watsonianus (Maxon) B.Øllg.
- Phlegmariurus weberbaueri (Nessel) B.Øllg.
- Phlegmariurus weddellii (Herter) B.Øllg.
- Phlegmariurus wilsonii (Underw. & F.E.Lloyd) B.Øllg.
- Phlegmariurus xiphophyllus (Baker) A.R.Field & Bostock
- Phlegmariurus yunfengii R.H.Jiang & X.C.Zhang
- Phlegmariurus yunnanensis Ching

One hybrid is known:

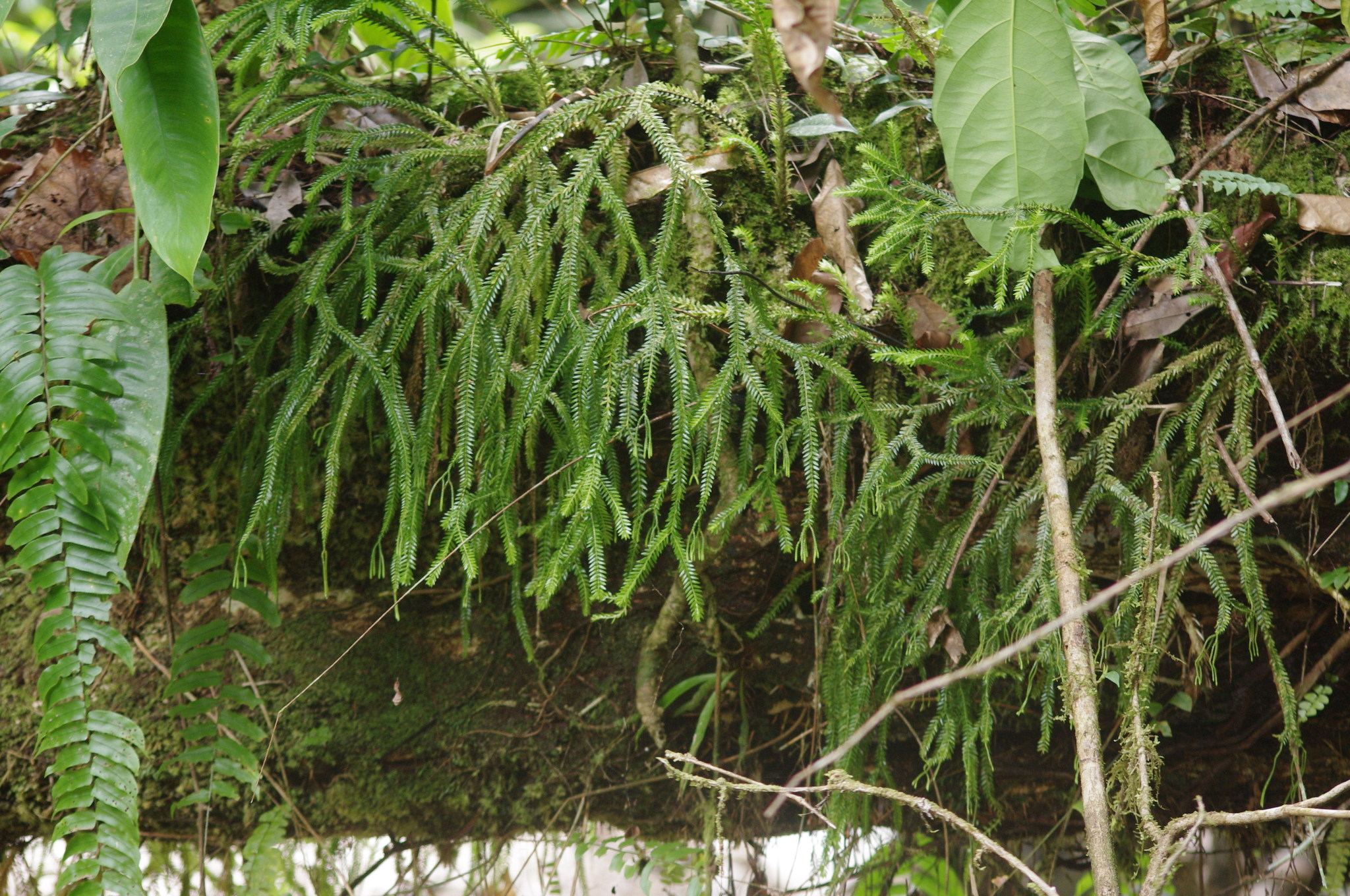
- Phlegmariurus phlegmarioides image from iNaturalist user: coenobita
  Phlegmariurus × koolauensis W.H.Wagner
