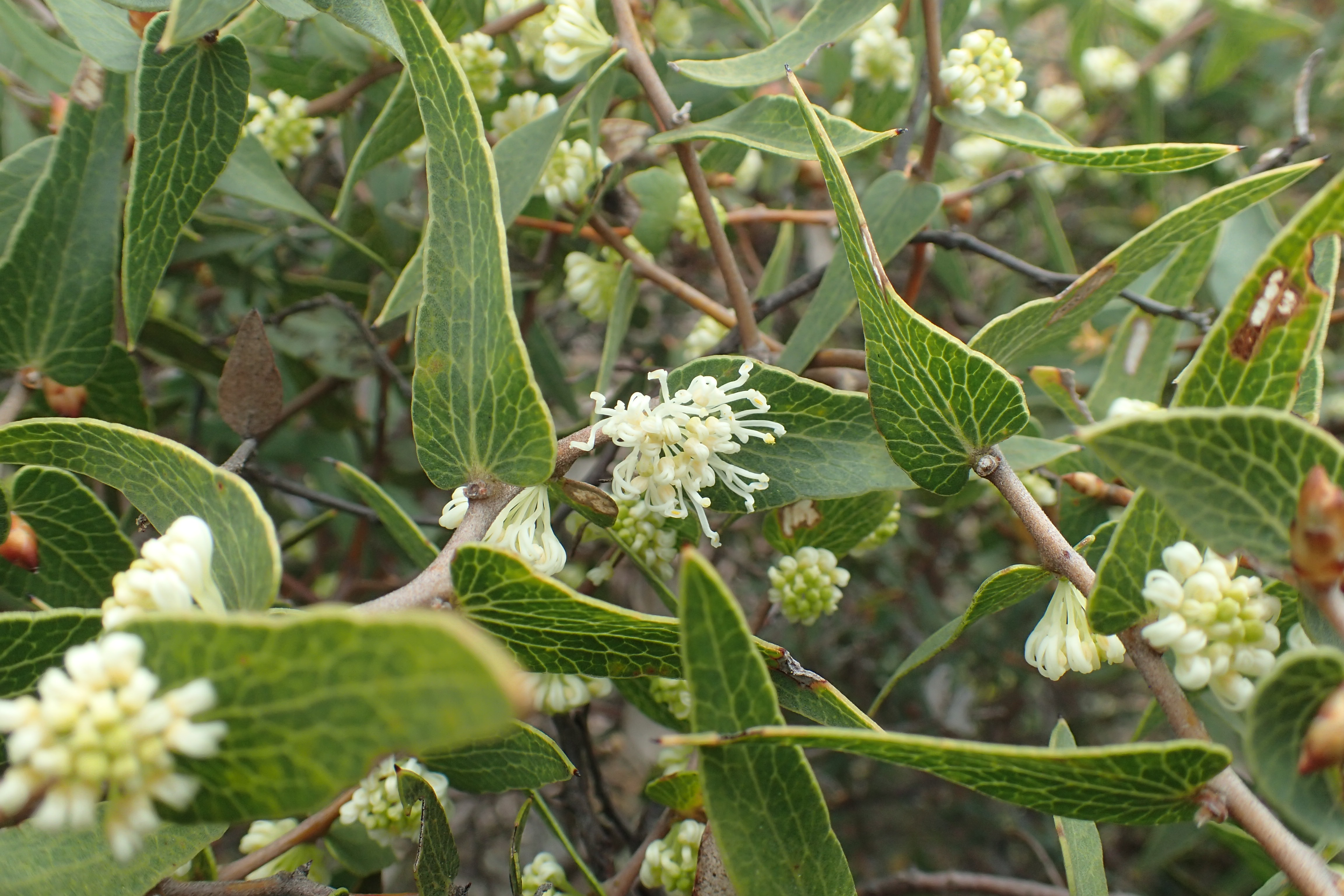

Scientific classification
- Kingdom: Plantae
- Clade: Tracheophytes
- Clade: Angiosperms
- Clade: Eudicots
- Order: Proteales
- Family: Proteaceae
- Genus: Hakea
- Species: H. hastata

Binomial name
- Hakea hastata Haegi
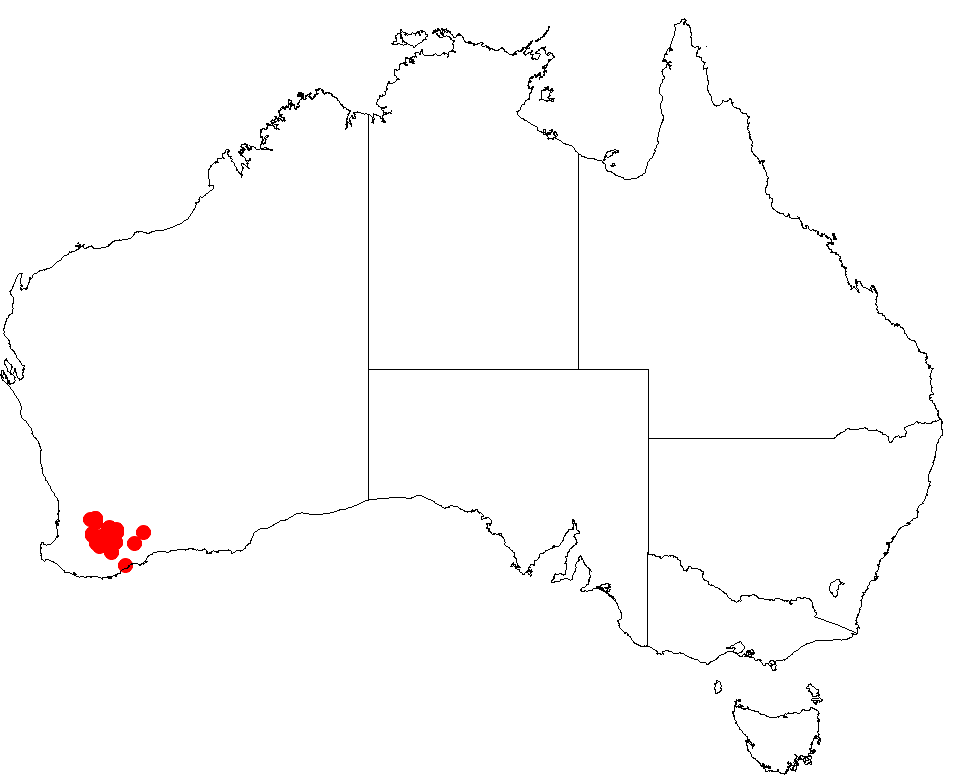
- Occurrence data from AVH

= Hakea hastata =

Species of shrub endemic to Western Australia

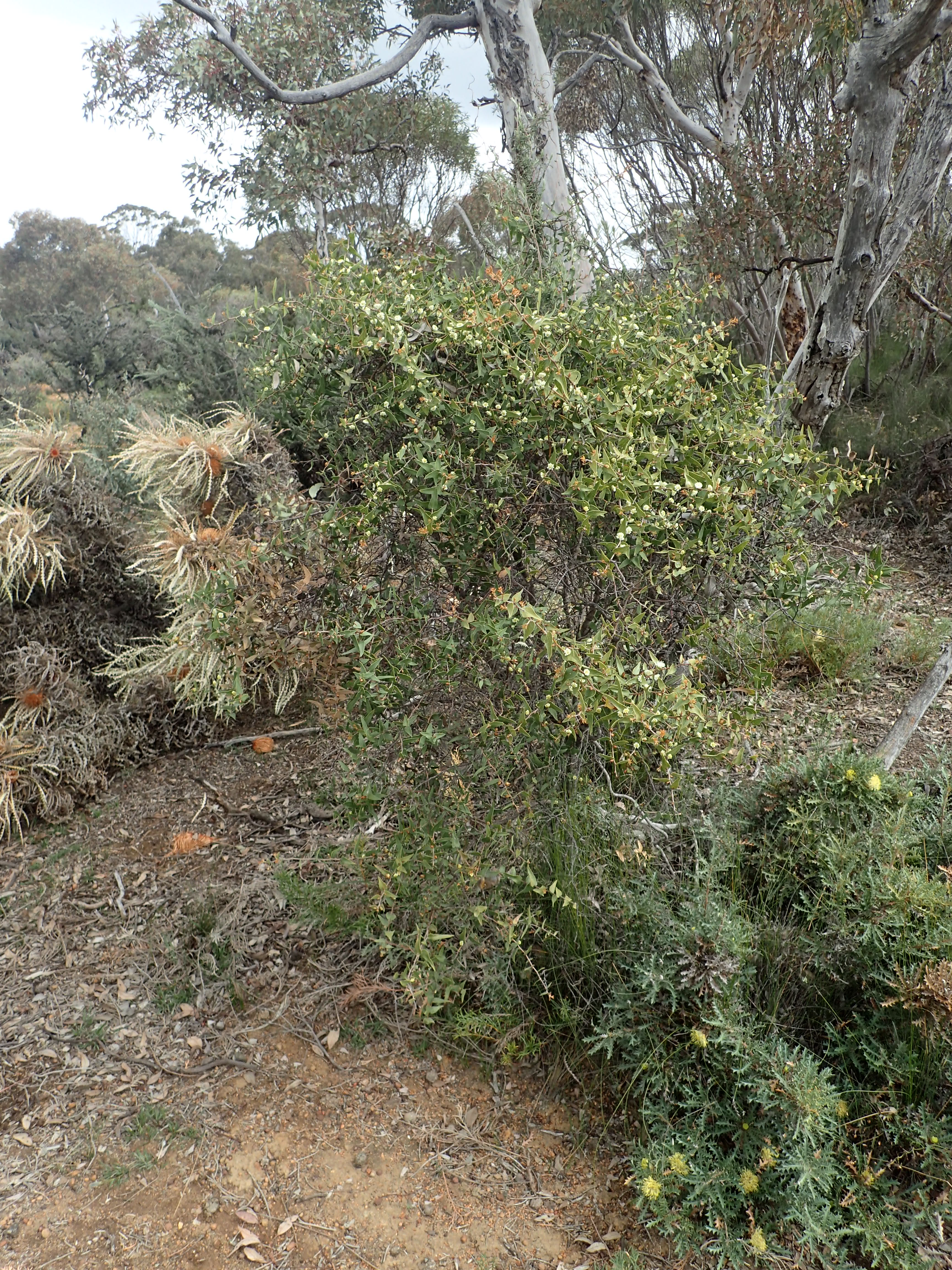
Habit south-west of Woodanilling

Hakea hastata is a shrub in the family Proteaceae and is endemic to southern Western Australia. It is an open, upright shrub with light green leaves, branches covered in dense hairs and white flowers in spring.

== Description ==
Hakea hastata is an erect open shrub that typically grows to a height of 1.5 to 3 metres (4.9 to 9.8 ft). It is sparingly branched with branchlets that are densely covered in pale brown hairs. The pale green leaves have a narrowly to broadly ovate shape and a length of 2 to 4.7 centimetres (0.8 to 1.9 in) and a width of 9 to 24 millimetres (0.354 to 0.945 in) with one to three longitudinal nerves. It blooms from September to October and produces white flowers. The solitary inflorescences contain 18 to 22 flowers with a cream-white coloured perianth. After flowering, woody fruits form that have an obliquely ovate to broadly ovate shape and are 1.6 to 2.0 cm (0.63 to 0.79 in) in length and 0.9 to 1.2 cm (0.35 to 0.47 in) wide with an obscure beak. The blackish brown seeds have an obliquely ovate or elliptic shape with a wing down one side.

== Taxonomy and naming ==
Hakea hastata was first formally described by the botanist Laurence Haegi in 1999 in the appendix to the Flora of Australia from specimens collected in 1871 by Hansjörg Eichler in the Tuttanning Nature Reserve. The specific epithet is from the Latin word hastata meaning spear-like referring to the spear-head shape of the leaves.

== Distribution ==
This hakea is endemic an area in the Wheatbelt and Great Southern regions of Western Australia from around Pingelly in the north to Albany in the south and has a scattered distribution. The shrub is found on and around hills and grows in sandy, loamy or clay soils that can contain gravel. It is usually part of a heath understorey community in Eucalyptus woodlands.
