= Huara hastata =

Conservation status
- Not Threatened (NZ TCS)

Scientific classification
- Kingdom: Animalia
- Phylum: Arthropoda
- Subphylum: Chelicerata
- Class: Arachnida
- Order: Araneae
- Infraorder: Araneomorphae
- Family: Desidae
- Genus: Huara
- Species: H. hastata

Binomial name
- Huara hastata Forster & Wilton, 1973

Species of spider

Huara hastata is a species of Desidae that is endemic to New Zealand.

== Taxonomy ==
This species was described by Ray Forster and Cecil Wilton in 1973 from female and male specimens. The holotype is stored in Otago Museum.

== Description ==
The female is recorded at 3.43mm in length whereas the male is 2.75mm.

== Distribution ==
This species is only known from Otago and Southland, New Zealand.

== Conservation status ==
Under the New Zealand Threat Classification System, this species is listed as "Not Threatened".
