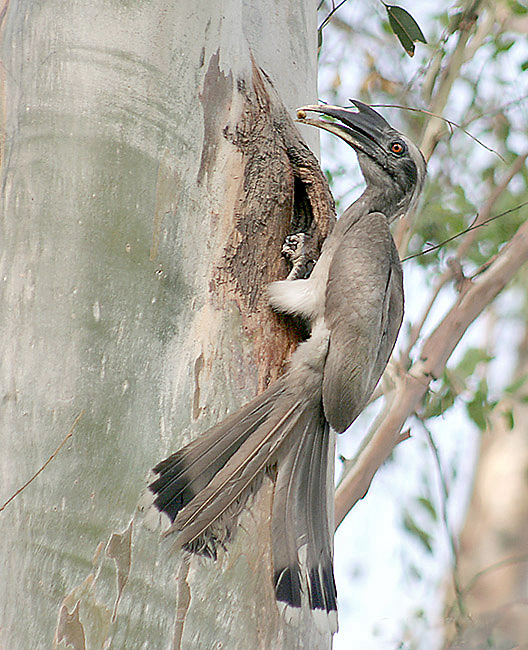
- A male bird feeding the female at a nest in Punjab

Conservation status
- Least Concern (IUCN 3.1)

Scientific classification
- Kingdom: Animalia
- Phylum: Chordata
- Class: Aves
- Order: Bucerotiformes
- Family: Bucerotidae
- Genus: Ocyceros
- Species: O. birostris

Binomial name
- Ocyceros birostris (Scopoli, 1786)

Synonyms
- Lophoceros birostris Tockus birostris Ocyceros ginginianus Meniceros birostris

Audio
- A recording made in Maharashtra

= Indian grey hornbill =

Species of bird

The Indian gray hornbill (Ocyceros birostris) is a common hornbill found on the Indian subcontinent. It is mostly arboreal and is commonly sighted in pairs. It has grey feathers all over the body with a light grey or dull white belly. The horn is black or dark grey with a casque extending to the point of curvature of the horn. It is one of the few hornbill species found in urban areas in many cities where they are able to make use of large trees in avenues.

== Description ==
The Indian grey hornbill is a medium-sized hornbill, measuring around 61 cm (24 in) in length. The upper parts are greyish brown and there is a slight trace of a pale supercilium. The ear coverts are darker. The flight feathers of the wing are dark brown with a whitish tip. The tail has a white tip and a dark subterminal band. They have a red iris and the eyelids have eyelashes. The casque is short and pointed.

The male has a larger casque on a dark bill, and the culmen and lower mandible are yellowish. The bare skin around the eye is dark in the male, but sometimes pale reddish in females. The female has a more yellowish bill with black on the basal half and on the casque. The juveniles lack the casque, and the bare skin around the eye is dull orange.

== Distribution ==
The species is found mainly on the plains up to about 2,000 ft (610 m). It is found from the foothills of the Himalayas southwards, bounded to the west by the Indus system and to the east by the Ganges Delta. It may make local movements in the drier western region. It is found even in cities that have old avenue trees. The species has been observed, usually in pairs, in Dharamsala town (Himachal Pradesh) at about 1500 to 1600 masl during summer and in the rainy season (May to September, 2017). and does not overlap much with the Malabar grey hornbill of the Western Ghats.

Over 60 years after disappearing from Gujarat’s Gir forests, the reintroduced Indian Grey Hornbill has achieved four straight years of successful breeding.

== Behaviour and ecology ==
The call is a squealing call somewhat like that of a black kite. The flight is heavy and involves flapping interspersed with glides. They are found in pairs or small groups.

The nesting season is April to June and the clutch varies from one to five very symmetrical white eggs. Indian grey hornbills usually nest in tree hollows on tall trees. An existing hollow may be excavated further to suit. The female enters the nest hollow and seals the nest hole, leaving only a small vertical slit through which the male feeds her. The nest entrance is sealed by the female using its excreta and mud-pellets supplied by the male. While inside the nest, the female moults her flight feathers and incubates the eggs. The male provides the nest inmates with a steady supply of bark pieces to ensure that the excreta is removed from the nest by absorption and adsorption and to help maintain the micro-climate within the nest cavity. The regrowth of the female's feathers coincides with the maturity of the chicks, at which point the nest is broken open.

A study at a nest near Mumbai noted that the key fruiting trees on which the hornbills fed were Streblus asper, Cansjera rheedii, Carissa carandas, Grewia tiliaefolia, Lannea coromandelica, Ficus spp., Sterculia urens and Securinega leucopyrus. They are also known to take molluscs, scorpions, insects, small birds (they have been recorded removing and possibly preying on rose-ringed parakeet chicks) and reptiles in their diet They are known to feed on the fruits of Thevetia peruviana, which are known to be toxic to many vertebrates.

They are almost completely arboreal, but very rarely descend to the ground to pick up fallen fruits, to dust bathe, or to pick up mud pellets to seal the nest cavity during the nesting period. They indulge in various social activities, including bill-grappling and aerial jousting.

== Gallery ==
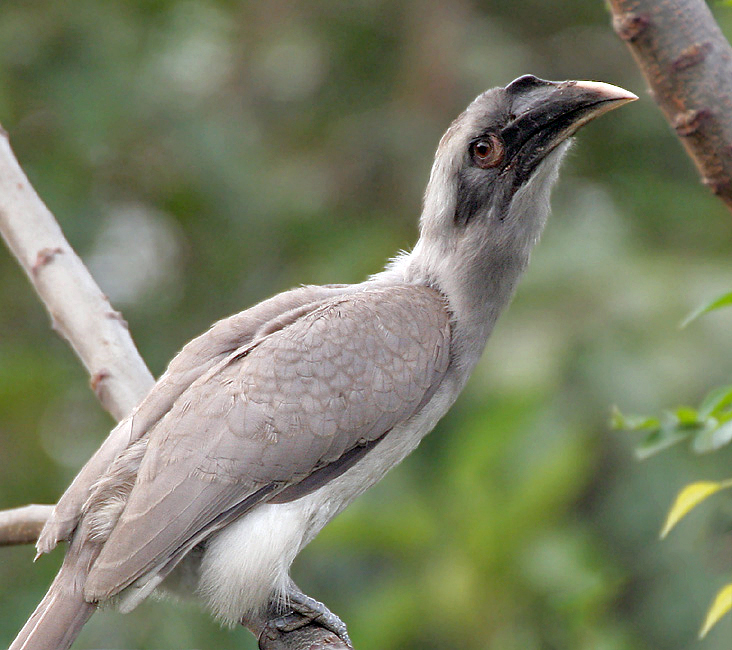
Individual with a shorter casque, either a juvenile or female

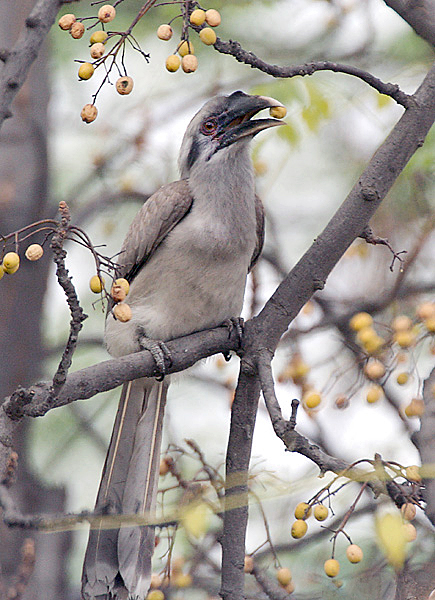
At Uttarakhand, India

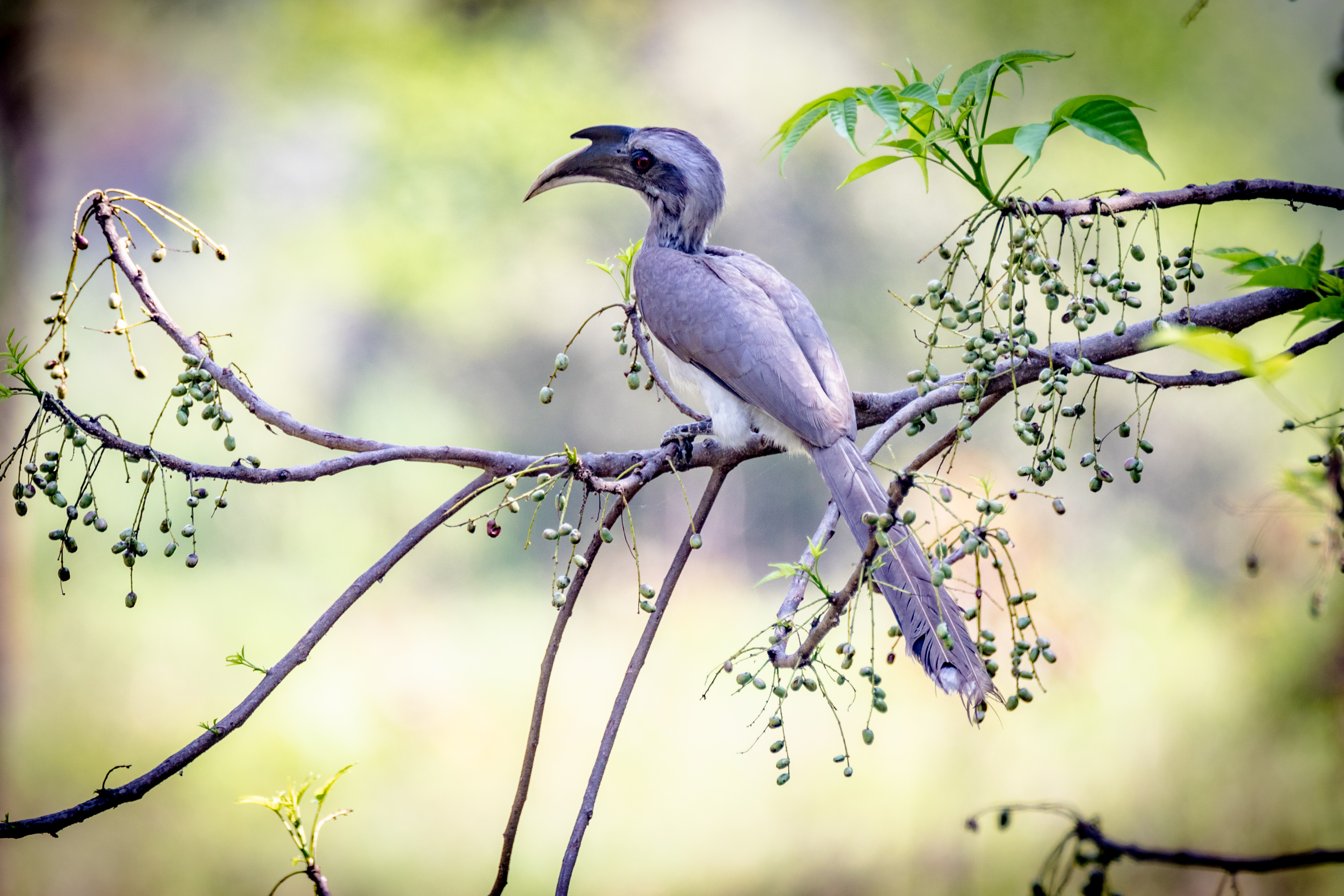
In Janakpur, Nepal

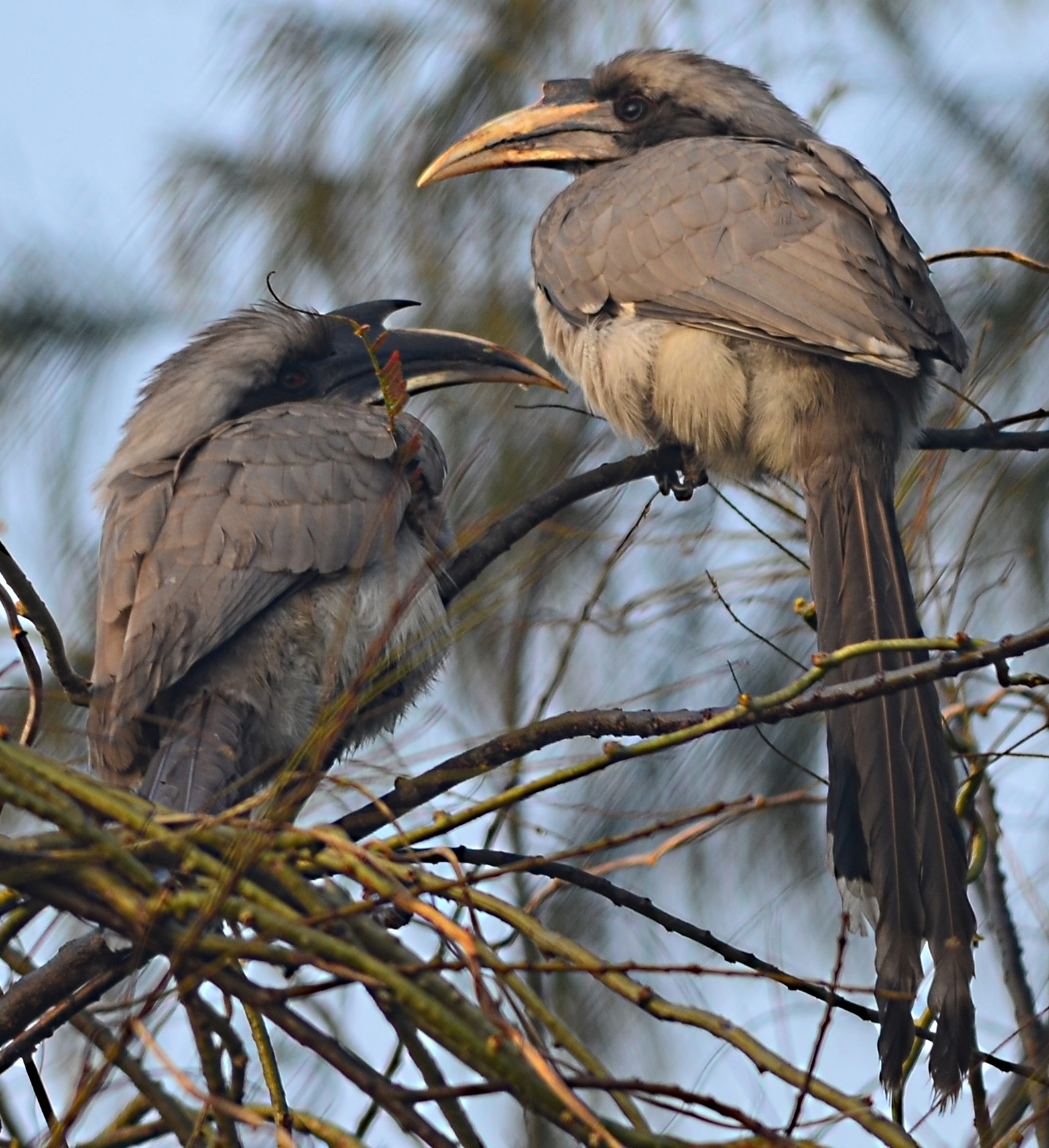
A pair (female right and male at left) at Mohali, Punjab, northern India

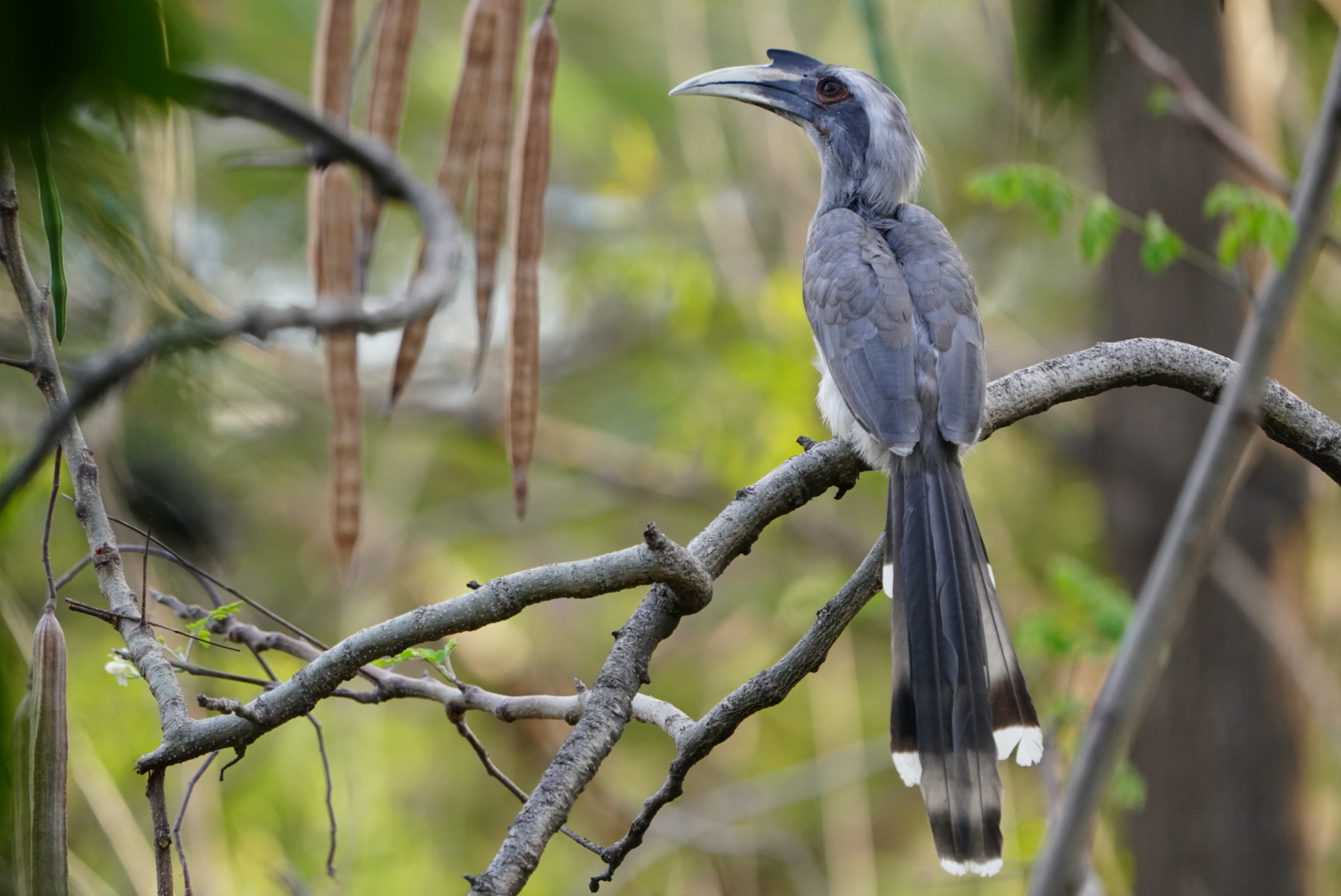
Indian Grey Hornbill in Pune. Note the casque, and the distinctive tail feathers.
