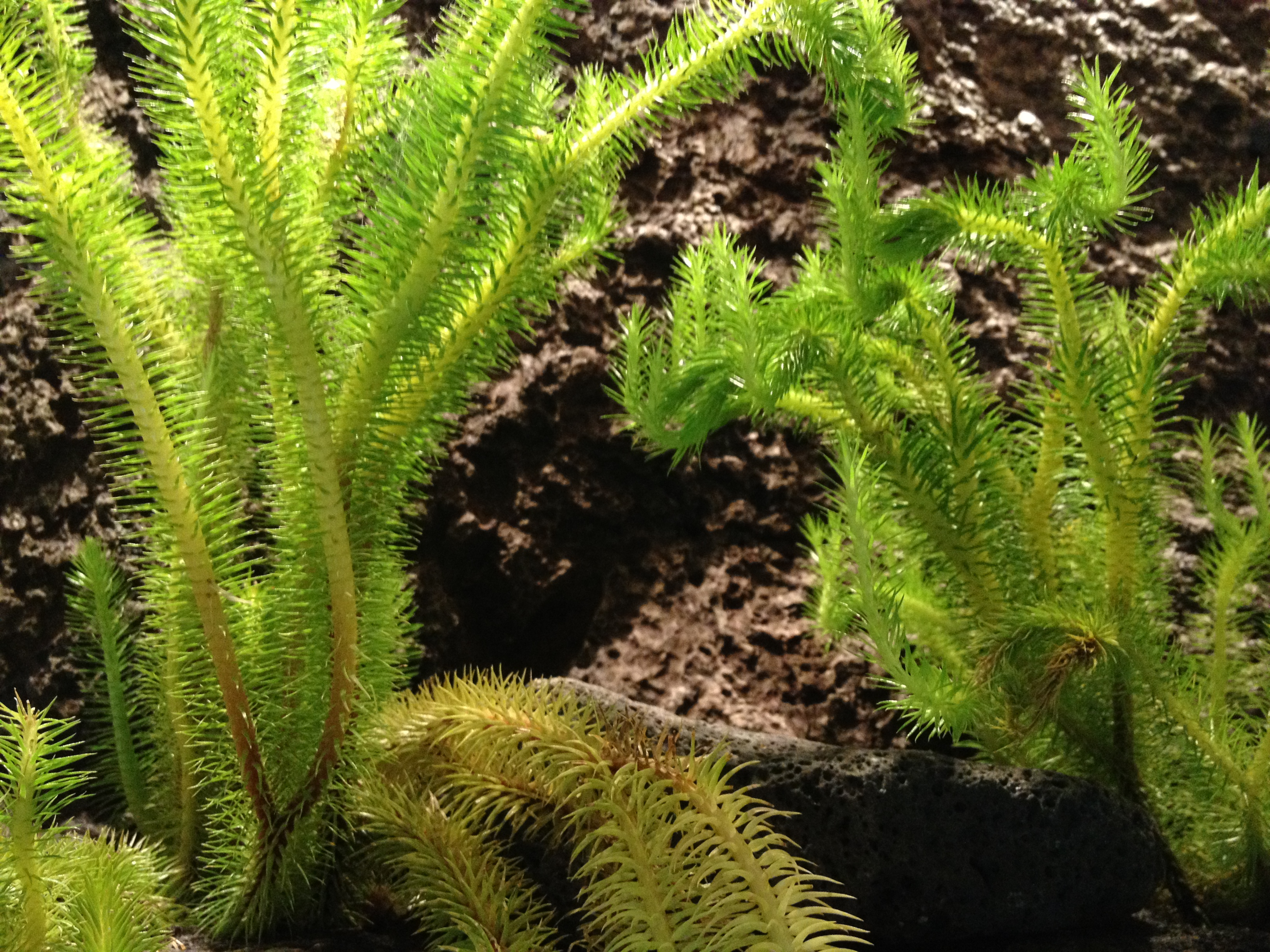
- In cultivation

Scientific classification
- Kingdom: Plantae
- Clade: Tracheophytes
- Clade: Lycophytes
- Class: Lycopodiopsida
- Order: Lycopodiales
- Family: Lycopodiaceae
- Genus: Phlegmariurus
- Species: P. squarrosus

Binomial name
- Phlegmariurus squarrosus (G.Forst.) Á.Löve & D.Löve

Synonyms
- Huperzia acutifolia (Desv ex Poir.) Holub; Huperzia epiceifolia (Desv.ex Poir.) Trevis.; Huperzia forsteri Poir.; Huperzia hookeri (Hook.& Grev.) Holub; Huperzia remoganense Hayata; Huperzia squarrosa (G.Forst.) Rothm., comb. superfl.; Huperzia squarrosa (G.Forst.) Trevis.; Huperzia ulicifolia (Sw.) Trevis.; Lycopodium acutifolium Desv.ex Poir.; Lycopodium epiceifolium Desv.ex Poir.; Lycopodium forsteri Poir., nom. illeg. superfl.; Lycopodium gnidioides Blanco; Lycopodium hookeri Wall.ex Hook.& Grev.; Lycopodium lohitense D.D.Pant & P.S.Pandey; Lycopodium madagascariense Desv., nom. inval.; Lycopodium pseudosquarrosum Pamp.; Lycopodium squarrosum G.Forst.; Lycopodium ulicifolium Sw.; Phlegmariurus acutifolius (Desv.ex Poir.) A.R.Field & Testo; Phlegmariurus ulicifolius (Sw.) S.R.Ghosh; Plananthus squarrosa (Sw.) P.Beauv.; Urostachys epiceifolius (Desv.ex Poir.) Herter ex Nessel; Urostachys madagascariensis (Desv.ex Nessel) Herter; Urostachys madagascariensis (Nessel) Herter; Urostachys squarrosus (G.Forst.) Herter; Urostachys ulicifolius (Sw.) Herter ex Nessel

= Phlegmariurus squarrosus =

Species of spore-bearing plant

Phlegmariurus squarrosus is a species of lycophyte in the family Lycopodiaceae. The genus Phlegmariurus is accepted in the Pteridophyte Phylogeny Group classification of 2016 (PPG I), but not in other classifications, which submerge the genus in Huperzia, with this species as Huperzia squarrosa. The species has a wide distribution from the west Indian Ocean, through tropical and subtropical Asia to eastern Australia and the Pacific.
