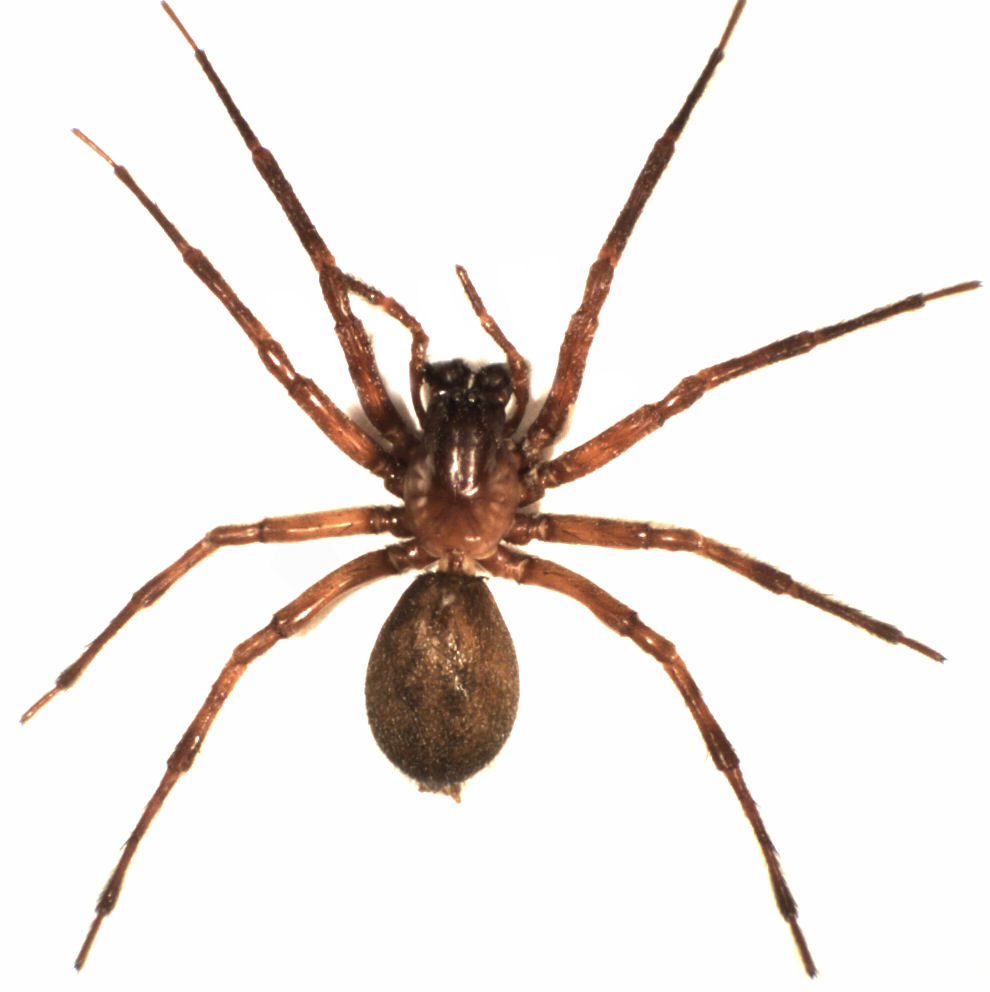
- Huara grossa

Scientific classification
- Kingdom: Animalia
- Phylum: Arthropoda
- Subphylum: Chelicerata
- Class: Arachnida
- Order: Araneae
- Infraorder: Araneomorphae
- Family: Desidae
- Genus: Huara; Forster, 1964

Type species
- H. antarctica (Berland, 1931)

Species
- 12, see text

= Huara (spider) =

Genus of spiders

Huara is a genus of intertidal spiders first described by Raymond Robert Forster in 1964. They are native to New Zealand.

== Species ==
As of April 2019 it contains twelve species, all found in New Zealand:

- Huara antarctica (Berland, 1931) – New Zealand (Auckland Is.)
- Huara chapmanae Forster & Wilton, 1973 – New Zealand
- Huara decorata Forster & Wilton, 1973 – New Zealand
- Huara dolosa Forster & Wilton, 1973 – New Zealand
- Huara grossa Forster, 1964 – New Zealand (Auckland Is.)
- Huara hastata Forster & Wilton, 1973 – New Zealand
- Huara inflata Forster & Wilton, 1973 – New Zealand
- Huara kikkawa Forster & Wilton, 1973 – New Zealand
- Huara marplesi Forster & Wilton, 1973 – New Zealand
- Huara mura Forster & Wilton, 1973 – New Zealand
- Huara ovalis (Hogg, 1909) – New Zealand (Snares Is.)
- Huara pudica Forster & Wilton, 1973 – New Zealand
