= Phlegmariurus hastatus =

Conservation status
- Endangered (IUCN 3.1)

Scientific classification
- Kingdom: Plantae
- Clade: Tracheophytes
- Clade: Lycophytes
- Class: Lycopodiopsida
- Order: Lycopodiales
- Family: Lycopodiaceae
- Genus: Phlegmariurus
- Species: P. hastatus

Binomial name
- Phlegmariurus hastatus (B.Øllg.) B.Øllg.

Synonyms
- Huperzia hastata B.Øllg.

Species of spore-bearing plant

Phlegmariurus hastatus is a species of plant in the family Lycopodiaceae. It is endemic to Ecuador, where it is known from two locations in Loja Province. It grows on the páramo, where it is threatened by grazing and fire.
