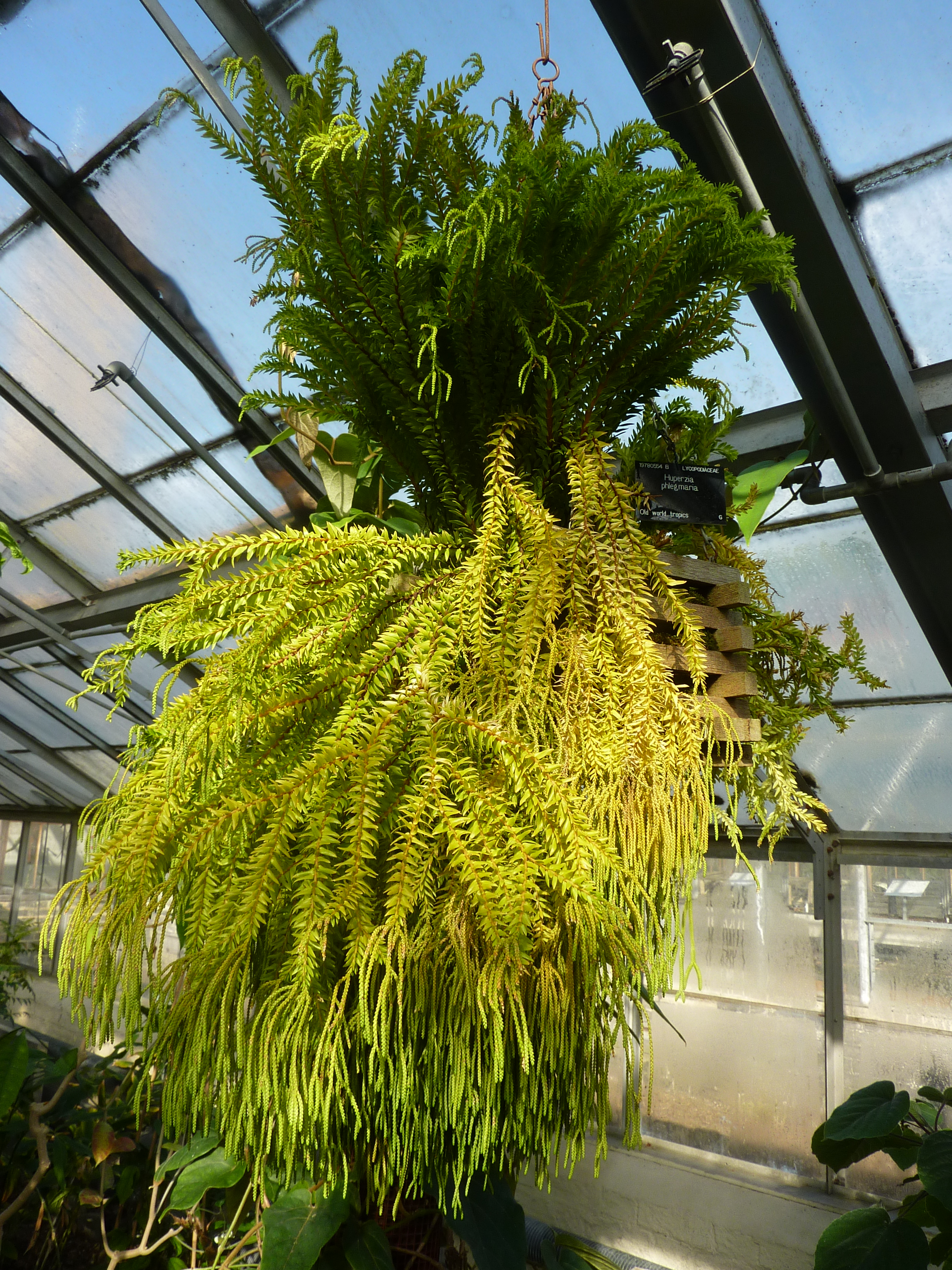
- Growing in the Cambridge University Botanic Garden

Conservation status
- Rare (NCA)

Scientific classification
- Kingdom: Plantae
- Clade: Tracheophytes
- Clade: Lycophytes
- Class: Lycopodiopsida
- Order: Lycopodiales
- Family: Lycopodiaceae
- Genus: Phlegmariurus
- Species: P. phlegmaria

Binomial name
- Phlegmariurus phlegmaria (L.) Holub

Synonyms
- 23 synonyms: Huperzia feejeensis (Luerss.) Holub; Huperzia phlegmaria (L.) Rothm.; Huperzia phlegmaria var. divaricatum Blume; Huperzia simonii (Nessel) Holub; Lepidotis phlegmaria (L.) P.Beauv.; Lycopodium filiforme Wall. ex Roxb.; Lycopodium horizontale var. submoniliforme Alderw.; Lycopodium phlegmaria L.; Lycopodium phlegmaria var. longibracteatum Domin; Lycopodium phlegmaria var. parvifolium Spring; Lycopodium phlegmarium var. feejeense Luerss.; Lycopodium transiens Alderw.; Lycopodium vrieseanum Spring; Phlegmariurus phlegmaria (L.) T.Sen & U.Sen; Phlegmariurus phlegmaria var. laxosporophyllus Gias & Pasha; Urostachys borneensis Herter; Urostachys feejeensis (Luerss.) Herter; Urostachys leonis Herter; Urostachys phlegmaria (L.) Herter ex Nessel; Urostachys simonii Nessel; Urostachys submoniliformis (Alderw) Herter; Urostachys transiens (Alderw.) Herter ex Nessel; Urostachys vrieseanus (Spring) Herter ex Nessel

= Phlegmariurus phlegmaria =

Species of fern

Phlegmariurus phlegmaria, synonym Huperzia phlegmaria, commonly known as either coarse tassel fern or common tassel fern, is an epiphytic species native to rainforests in Madagascar, some islands in the Indian Ocean, Asia, Australasia and many Pacific Islands. Phlegmariurus phlegmaria is commonly found in moist forests and rainforests at high altitudes, in and amongst mosses and other epiphytes. Members of the order Lycopodiales are commonly referred to as clubmosses.

== Description ==
A vascular species of lycophyte, Phlegmariurus phlegmaria resembles many species of moss. The specialised fluid-conducting tissues of vascular plants distinguish lycophytes from the more basal bryophytes (mosses and liverworts). The diploid sporophyte stage of the life cycle of lycophytes is dominant. Sporophytes produce tetrahedral spores of 37 × 35 μm, off-white in colour, with angles never exceeding 130°.

Phlegmariurus phlegmaria is a variable species and plants from different regions can vary widely in stature. They can be identified by having petiolate sterile microphylls and small fertile microphylls on thin branching strobili.

Individuals of Phlegmariurus phlegmaria have true root systems. Their elongated aerial stems hang from host trees (up to 80 centimetres [31 in] long). The spirally arranged leaves are lanceolate (lance like), narrow and rounded at the base. They become even narrower at the extreme base, where the sporangia are located in the fertile zone of the stem. Leaves of Phlegmariurus phlegmaria are coriaceous (resemble leather). The leaves differ in morphology in the fertile zone, making distinction between the zones easy. Leaves in the fertile zone are known as sporophylls. Sporophylls are club shaped - hence the common name "clubmoss". Homosporous spores are produced in axils.

== Native distribution ==
Phlegmariurus phlegmaria is native to east, west and south tropical Africa (in Cameroon; Comoros; Equatorial Guinea; Gabon; Ghana; Madagascar; Malawi; São Tomé and Príncipe; Sierra Leone; Tanzania (including the Zanzibar Archipelago); and Uganda); temperate and tropical Asia (in the Chinese provinces of Guangdong, Guangxi, Hainan, Yunnan; the southern Japanese prefecture of Kyushu, and the Ryukyu Islands; Malaysia; Sri Lanka; Taiwan; and Thailand); Australasia (in the northeast of Queensland in Australia; and New Zealand); and the northwest and southwest Pacific (in Fiji; Guam; and the Chuuk island group of Micronesia). It is likely native, but yet to be reported, in other paleotropic locales.

== Biotechnology ==
Many clubmosses produce highly flammable spores. Historically clubmoss spore coats have been used in the formation of fireworks and used in flash powders in the early life of photography. Clubmoss spores have also been used in the production of fingerprint powder and in the pharmaceutical industry to coat pills.
