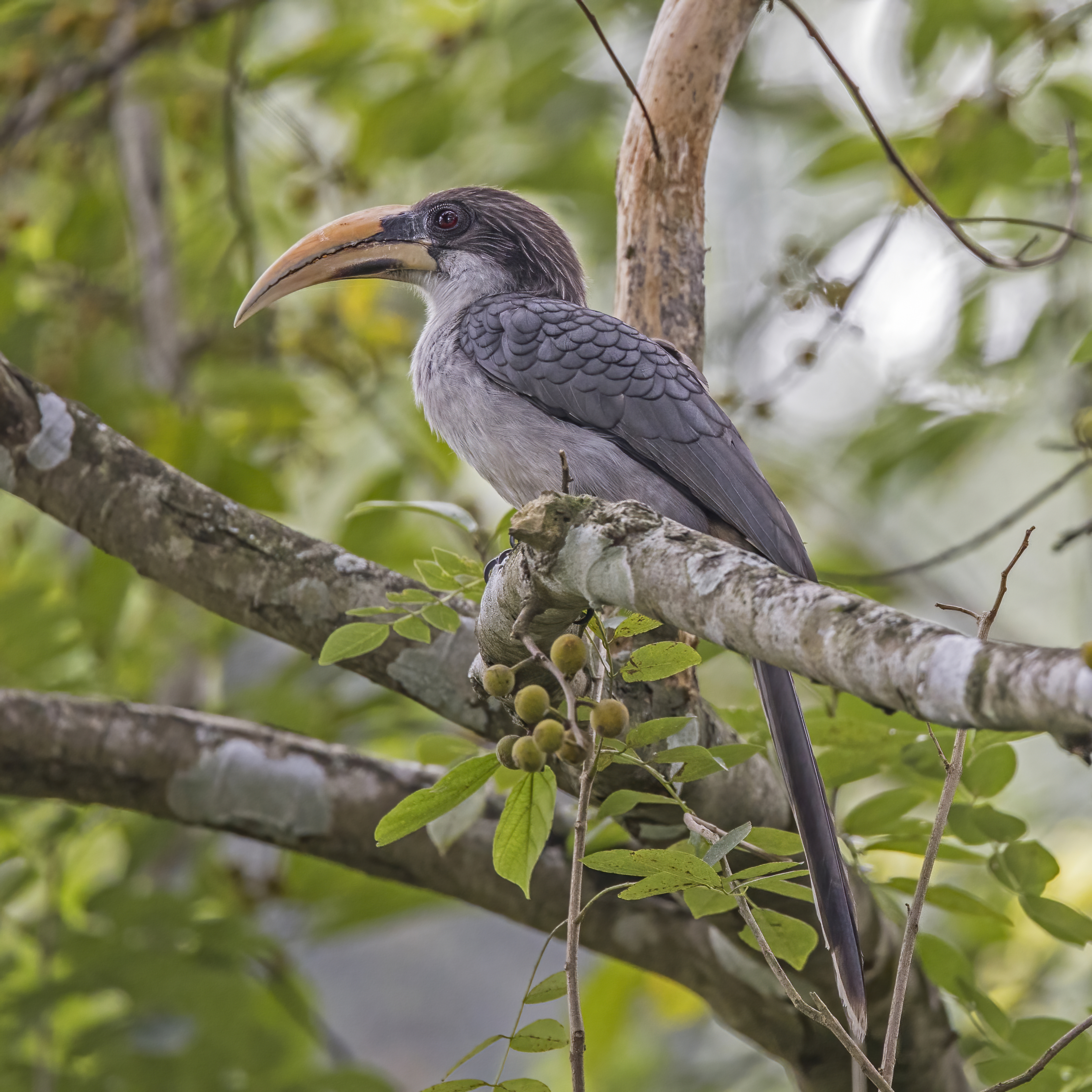
- at Kandy, Sri Lanka

Conservation status
- Least Concern (IUCN 3.1)

Scientific classification
- Kingdom: Animalia
- Phylum: Chordata
- Class: Aves
- Order: Bucerotiformes
- Family: Bucerotidae
- Genus: Ocyceros
- Species: O. gingalensis

Binomial name
- Ocyceros gingalensis (Shaw, 1812)
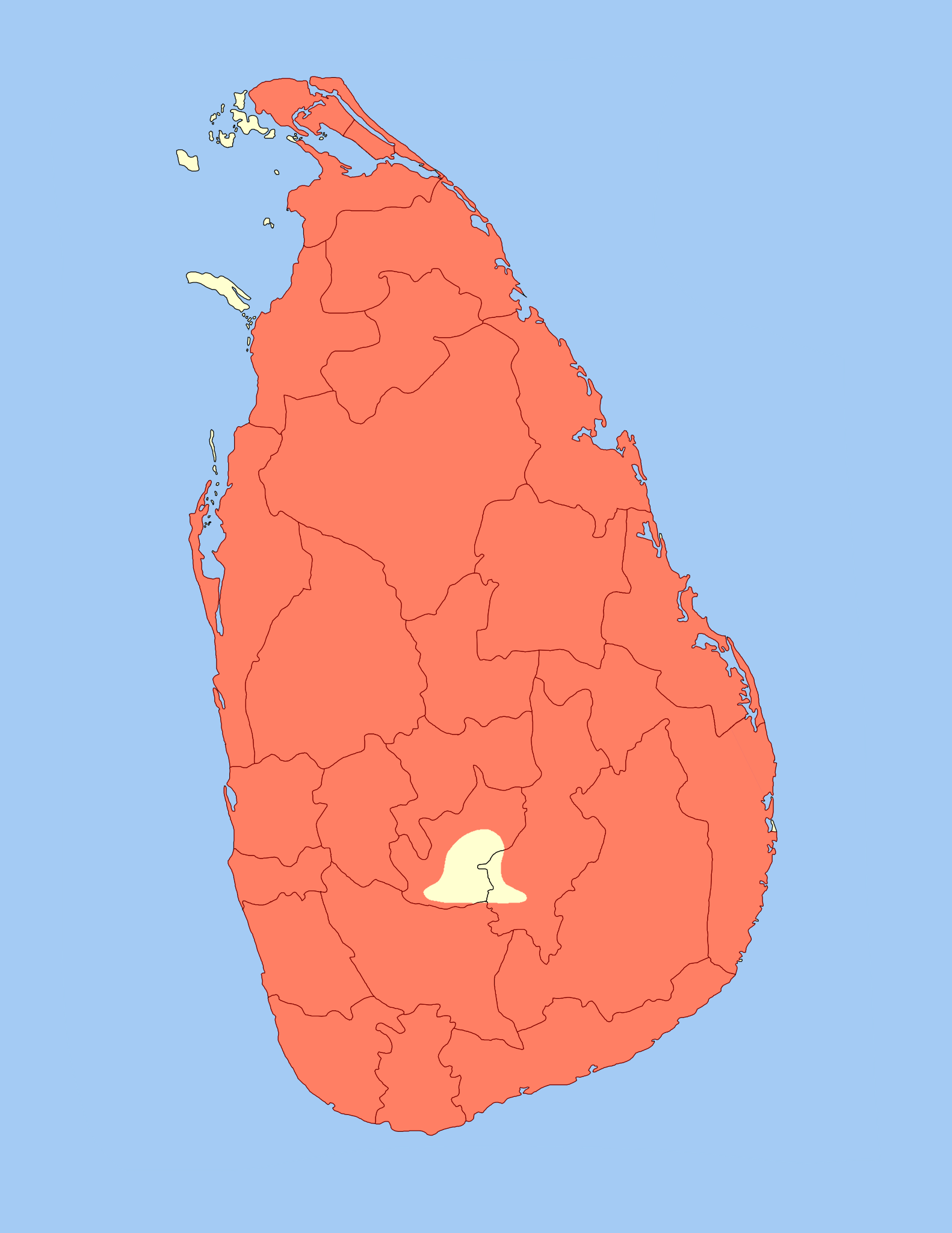

= Sri Lanka grey hornbill =

Species of bird

The Sri Lanka grey hornbill (Ocyceros gingalensis) is a bird in the hornbill family and a widespread and common endemic resident breeder in Sri Lanka. Hornbills are a family of tropical birds found in the Old World.

== Habitat ==
The Sri Lanka grey hornbill is a gregarious bird found in forest habitats.

== Description ==
The Sri Lanka grey hornbill is a large bird at 45 centimetres (18 in) in length. It has grey wings with black primary flight feathers, a grey back, and a brown crown. Its long tail is blackish with white sides, and the underparts are white. The long, curved bill has no casque. Sexes are similar, although the male has a cream-coloured bill, whereas the female's is black with a cream stripe. Immature birds have dark grey upperparts, a cream bill, and a tail with a white tip. Its flight is slow and powerful.

== Behaviour ==
The female lays up to four white eggs in a tree hole blocked off during incubation with a cement made of mud, droppings and fruit pulp. There is only one narrow aperture, barely wide enough for the male to transfer food to the mother and chicks. These birds usually live in pairs or small flocks consisting up to five birds (2 adults and 2-3 juveniles).

== Diet ==
They are omnivores observed consuming berries, fruits, insects and small lizards. It feeds mostly on figs, although occasionally it eats small rodents, reptiles and insects.
