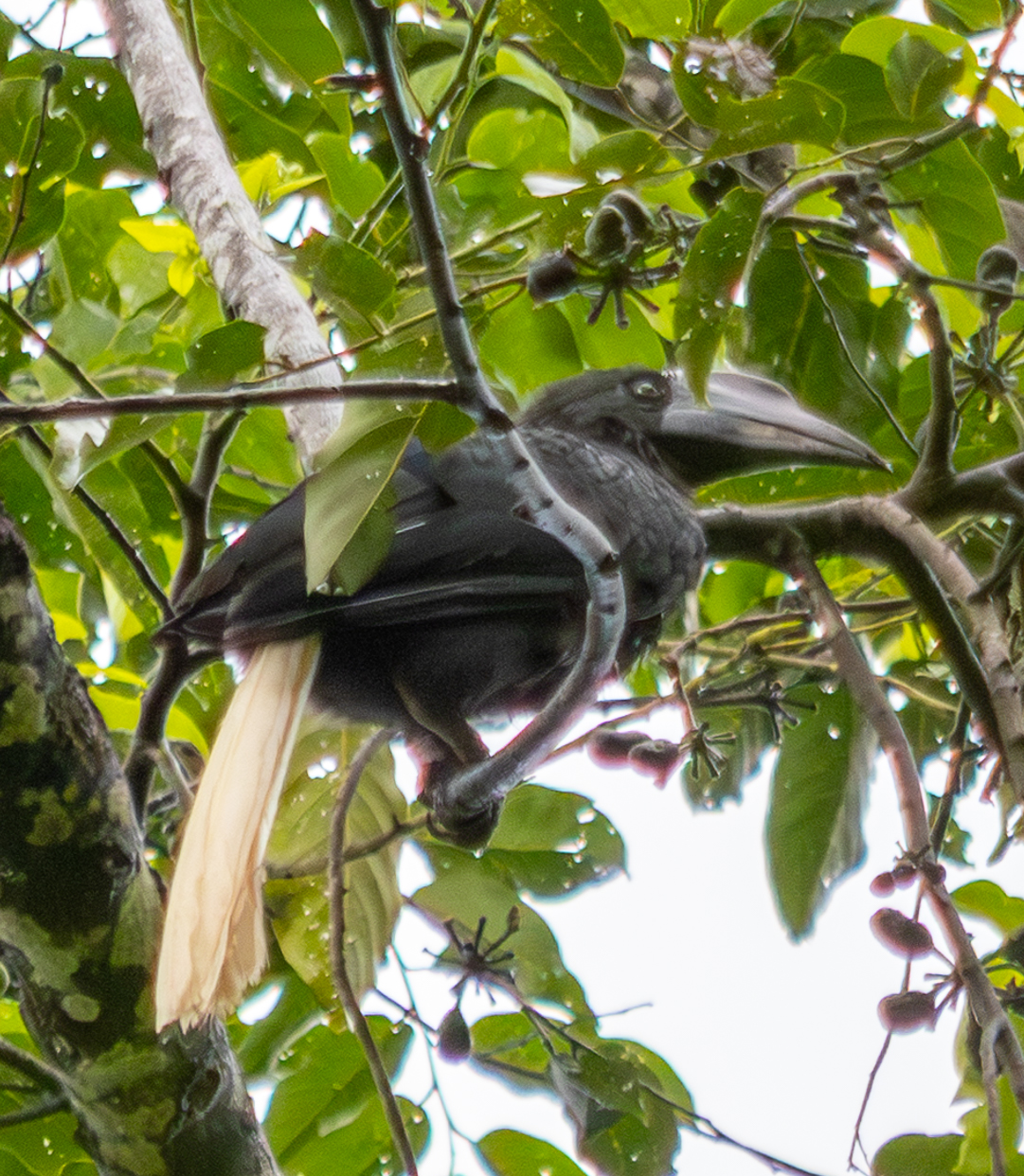
- Sulu Hornbill in the wild on Tawi-tawi Island
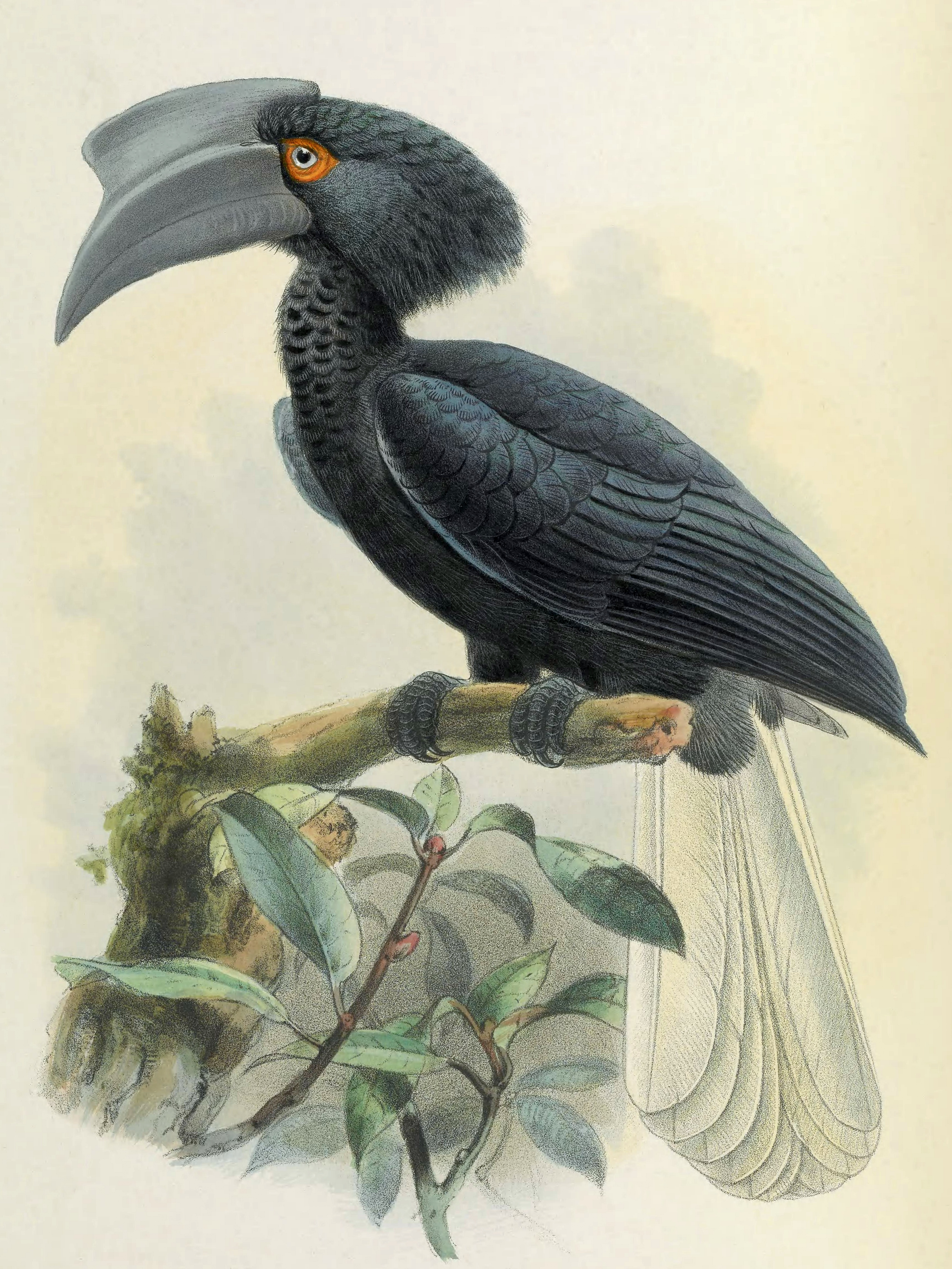
- A monograph by John Gerrard Keulemans

Conservation status
- Critically Endangered (IUCN 3.1)
- CITES Appendix II

Scientific classification
- Kingdom: Animalia
- Phylum: Chordata
- Class: Aves
- Order: Bucerotiformes
- Family: Bucerotidae
- Genus: Anthracoceros
- Species: A. montani

Binomial name
- Anthracoceros montani (Oustalet, 1880)

= Sulu hornbill =

Species of bird

The Sulu hornbill (Anthracoceros montani), or Montano's hornbill, is a species of hornbill in the family Bucerotidae. It is endemic to the Sulu archipelago in the Philippines, with the remaining populations in Tawi-Tawi; it is believed to have been hunted to extinction on Jolo. Its natural habitat is tropical moist forests. It is threatened by habitat loss as well as potential harvesting for food. Its diet includes fruit, insects, and small lizards.

In 2019 it was reported that only 27 mature individual hornbills are still believed to be alive in the wild, making it one of the most endangered animals in the world.

== Description and taxonomy ==
The Sulu hornbill forms a monphyletic group, and is most closely related to the last common ancestor of its sister clade containing the Palawan hornbill, Malabar pied hornbill and the Oriental pied hornbill.

== Ecology and behavior ==
It is locally known as "tawsi".

=== Feeding ===
Diet is mainly fruit but also feeds on insects, small mammals and reptiles.

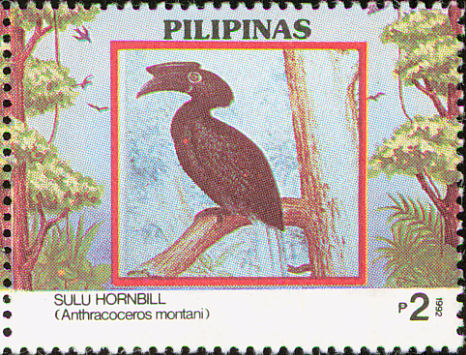
Sulu hornbill featured in a 1992 Philippine stamp of endangered species

=== Breeding ===
All hornbills are monogamous and mate for life. They are cavity nesters and rely on large dipterocarp trees for breeding. The female seals itself within the tree cavity and the male is in charge of gathering food for its mate and chicks. The male stores food in a gular pouch and regurgitates it to feed its mate and chicks.

Species specific information on its breeding habits are limited. Nests have been recorded from June to September. Reported to lay 2 eggs.

== Habitat and conservation status ==
It inhabits primary dipterocarp forest, typically on mountain slopes (although this may simply reflect a constraint enforced by forest loss), occasionally visiting isolated fruiting trees over 1 km from the nearest forest. It requires large trees for nesting.

The International Union for Conservation of Nature has assessed this bird as critically endangered. In 2019, it was reported that only 27 mature individual hornbills are still believed to be alive in the wild. However, these figures are rough estimates and this figure is disputed. Biggest numbers in the past decade seen together was 10 mature birds in 2014.

While the exact numbers are unknown, this is still undoubtedly the most endangered hornbill and one of the most endangered animals in the entire world. It has gone extinct on the island of Jolo with the last record in 1930s, due to hunting and the remaining populations in Tawi-Tawi are threatened by habitat destruction through logging and slash-and-burn farming.

The only species specific conservation actions as of 2019 were 16 "tawsi Rangers" employed by the local government patrolling against illegal logging and protecting nests.

In 2019, 44 participants which included military, conservationists, local government participated in a meeting hosted by the IUCN Species Survival Commission to formulate a species conservation plan. This meeting created a 10 year plan for the species continued survival. Conservation actions proposed were to improve the estimates on population and understanding of its ecology. This plan also included the creation of a species conservation program that involved the locals.

While an ex-situ captive breeding program was discussed, participants agreed that due to issues with ownership of the birds and general lack of expertise, these plans were to be re-explored 6-10 years in the future.
