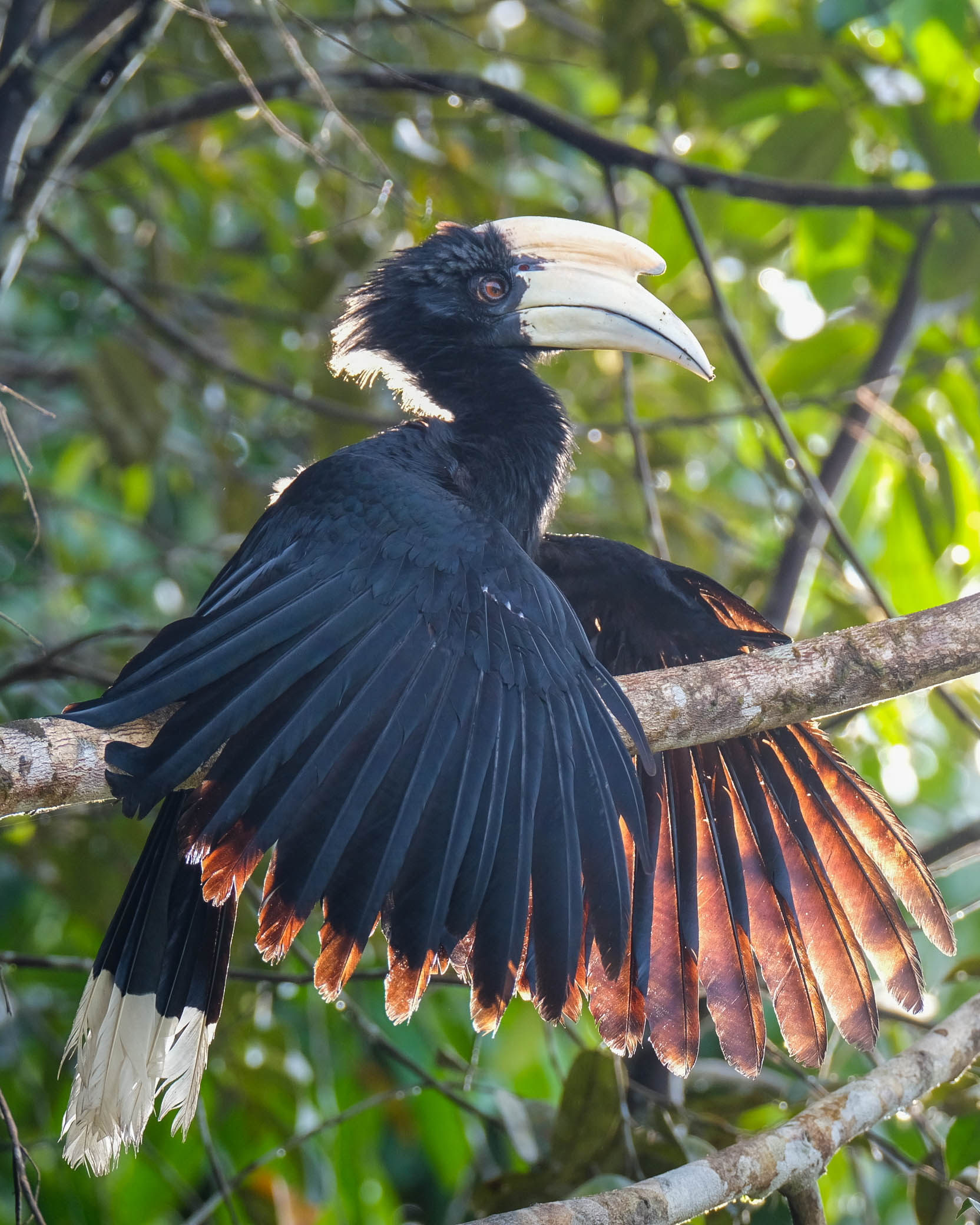
- Male at London Zoo, England

Conservation status
- Vulnerable (IUCN 3.1)
- CITES Appendix II (CITES)

Scientific classification
- Kingdom: Animalia
- Phylum: Chordata
- Class: Aves
- Order: Bucerotiformes
- Family: Bucerotidae
- Genus: Anthracoceros
- Species: A. malayanus

Binomial name
- Anthracoceros malayanus (Raffles, 1822)

= Black hornbill =

Species of bird

The black hornbill (Anthracoceros malayanus) is a species of bird of the hornbill family Bucerotidae. It lives in Asia in Brunei Darussalam, Indonesia, Malaysia, Singapore, Thailand.

The species has a selectiveness towards the environment and resources when it comes to reproduction. It is a lowland specialist. This organism will only start breeding and nesting when there is a large supply of fruits available, and in trees of larger size. When there are limited resources available, and may curtail nesting for years when there is a low availability of fruits(4). It is the major seed disperser for Durio graveolens, a species of durian. The connection is strong enough to reflect in some of the common names for the fruit: The Kenyah and Dayak peoples call it durian anggang (lit. 'hornbill durian'), and in Malay it is called durian burong/durian burung (lit. 'durian bird'). It also has a role in seed disbursement for Vitex pinnata.

It is known to fly for hours at a time.

It is threatened by hunting and habitat loss.

== Diet ==
It is a frugivore, eating a wide range of fruits—over 50 species. It most commonly feeds on figs and Vitex pinnata; its diet includes Sterculia cordata and Durio graveolens.

== Description ==
The male has a yellowish bill while the female has a dark grey bill.

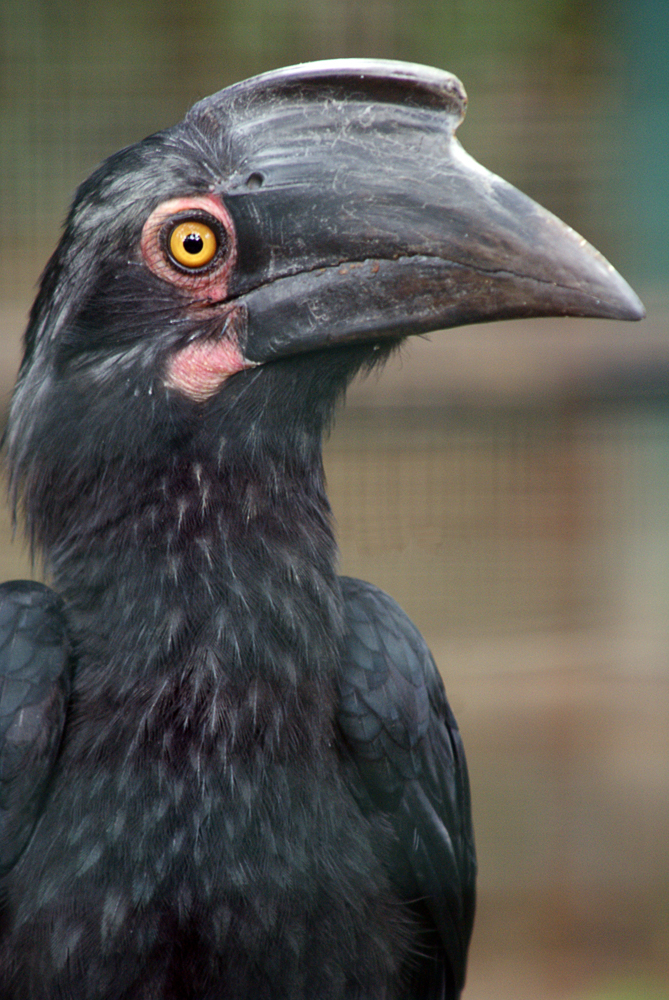
Female at Kuala Lumpur Bird Park, Malaysia

Anthracoceros malayanus birdsong
Birdsong of Anthracoceros malayanus
