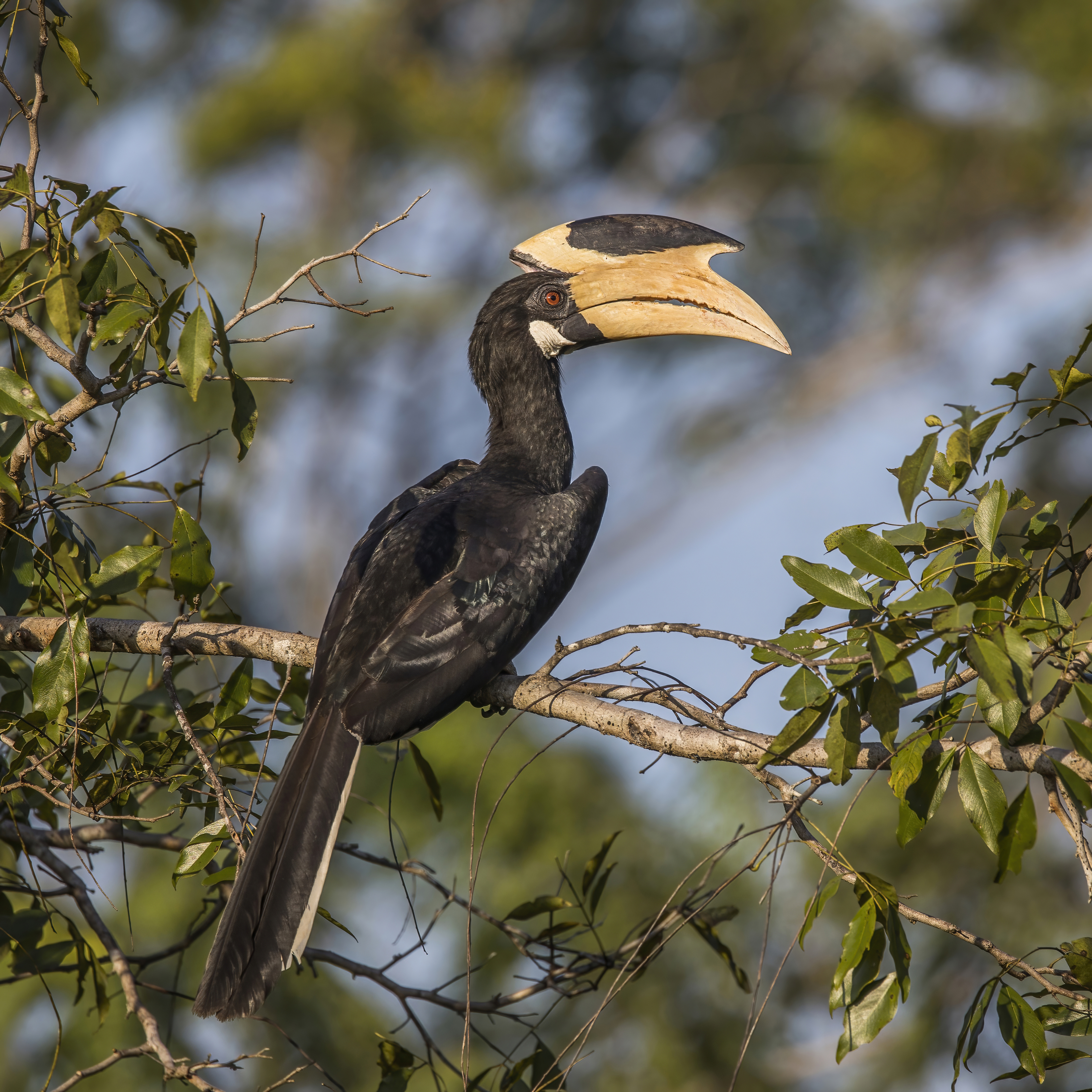
- Male
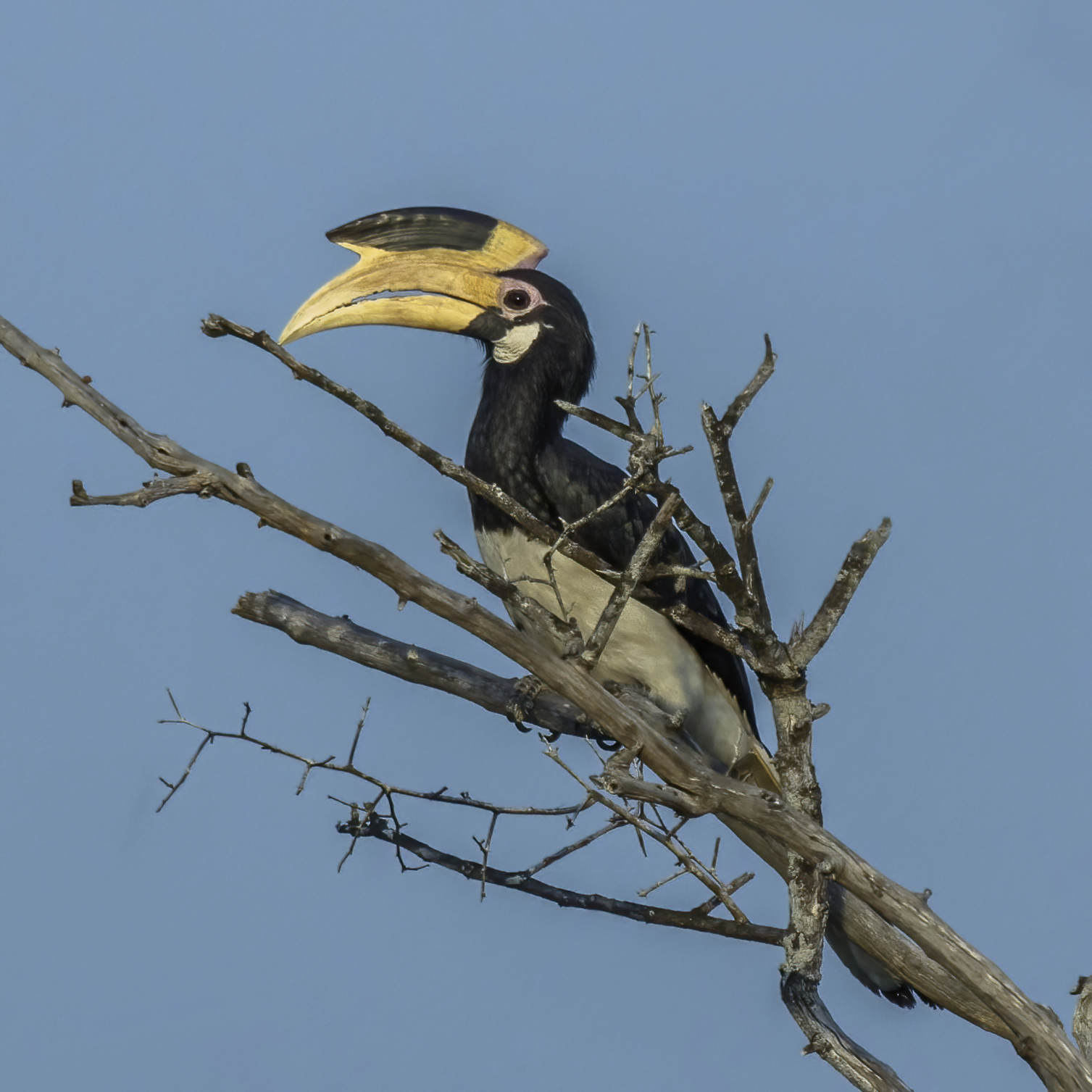
- Female

Conservation status
- Near Threatened (IUCN 3.1)
- CITES Appendix II

Scientific classification
- Kingdom: Animalia
- Phylum: Chordata
- Class: Aves
- Order: Bucerotiformes
- Family: Bucerotidae
- Genus: Anthracoceros
- Species: A. coronatus

Binomial name
- Anthracoceros coronatus (Boddaert, 1783)

= Malabar pied hornbill =

Species of bird

The Malabar pied hornbill (Anthracoceros coronatus), also known as the lesser pied hornbill, is a bird in the hornbill family, a family of tropical birds found in the Old World. The Malabar pied hornbill is a large hornbill, measuring 65 cm (26 in) in length. It has mainly black plumage with a white belly and throat patch, and a yellow bill with a large black casque. The Malabar pied hornbill is a common resident breeder in Sri Lanka and parts of India. It is an omnivore, feeding on fruits, small mammals, birds, small reptiles and insects.

== Taxonomy ==
The Malabar pied hornbill was described by the French polymath Georges-Louis Leclerc, Comte de Buffon in 1780 in his Histoire Naturelle des Oiseaux. The bird was also illustrated in a hand-coloured plate engraved by François-Nicolas Martinet in the Planches Enluminées D'Histoire Naturelle, which was produced under the supervision of Edme-Louis Daubenton to accompany Buffon's text. Neither the plate caption nor Buffon's description included a scientific name but in 1783 the Dutch naturalist Pieter Boddaert coined the binomial name Buceros coronatus in his catalogue of the Planches Enluminées. The Malabar pied hornbill is now placed in the genus Anthracoceros that was introduced by the German naturalist Ludwig Reichenbach in 1849. The species is monotypic. The generic name combines the Ancient Greek anthrax, meaning "coal black" and kerōs, meaning "horn". The specific epithet coronatus is Latin for "crowned".

== Description ==
The Malabar pied hornbill is a large hornbill, at 65 cm (26 in) in length. It has mainly black plumage, apart from its white belly, throat patch, tail sides and trailing edge to the wings. The bill is yellow with a large, mainly black casque. Females have white orbital skin, which the males lack. Juveniles have no casque. It might be confused with the oriental pied hornbill. They weigh around 1 kg (2.2 pounds).

== Distribution and habitat ==
The Malabar pied hornbill is a common resident breeder in Sri Lanka and parts of India, including east-central India and the west coast. It inhabits mainly low-altitude moist evergreen and tall deciduous forests, particularly near rivers, but also occurs in plantations and more open forest. Its habitat is evergreen and moist deciduous forests, often near human settlements. It is distributed across three main regions within the Indian sub-continent: Central and Eastern India, along the Western Ghats, and in Sri Lanka. In Central and Eastern India, it ranges from western West Bengal through parts of Jharkhand, Chhattisgarh, Odisha, Madhya Pradesh, northern and eastern Maharashtra, northern Andhra Pradesh, and north-east tip of Telangana. Along the Western Ghats, the species is distributed in pockets along the eastern slopes and in the Konkan belt and west coast from western Maharashtra through Goa, western Karnataka and Tamil Nadu, and in Kerala. In Sri Lanka, the species occurs mainly in the low country and dry zone forests as well as home gardens.

== Nature and behaviour ==
=== Breeding ===
During incubation, the female lays two or three white eggs in a tree hole, which is blocked off with a cement made of mud, droppings and fruit pulp. There is only one narrow aperture, just big enough for the male to transfer food to the mother and chicks. When the chicks have grown too large for the mother to fit in the nest with them, she breaks out and rebuilds the wall, after which both parents feed the chicks.

=== Food and feeding ===
This species is omnivorous, taking fruits, small mammals, birds, small reptiles, insects etc. Prey is killed and swallowed whole. Figs are an important food, contributing 60% of their diet from May to February, the non-breeding season; during breeding, in March and April, up to 75% of the fruits delivered at the nest were figs. They also feed on other fruits, including those of the Strychnos nux-vomica, which are toxic to many vertebrates.

Great pied hornbills and Malabar pied hornbills are frequently spotted at the township of the Kaiga Atomic Power Station near Karwar in India. The rich biodiversity in the forest around the plant has become a niche for a wide variety of rare bird species. A study comparing populations over a 23-year period at Dandeli found no significant change.

In central India, tribal peoples believed that hanging a skull of the hornbill (known as dhanchidiya) brought wealth.

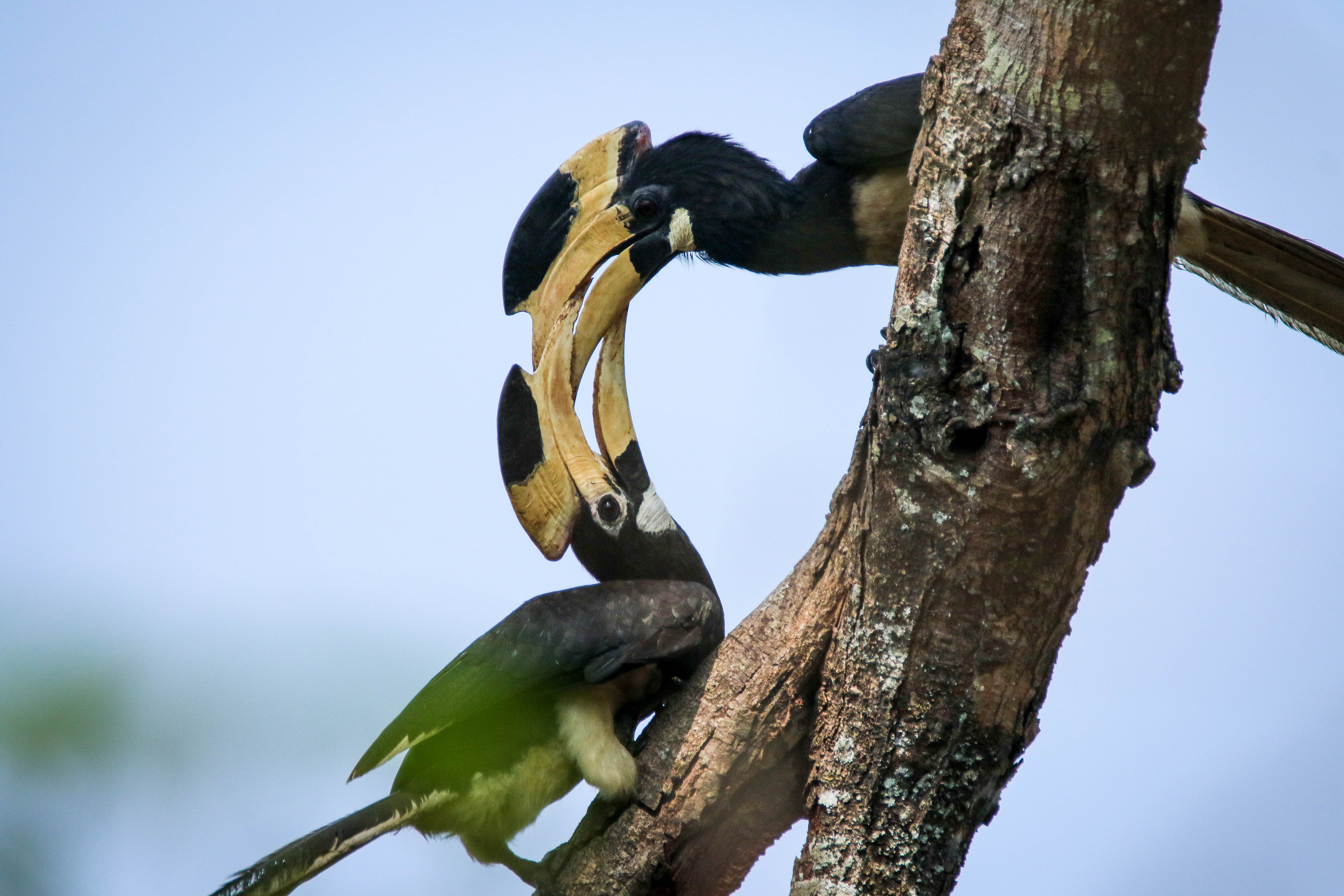
Pair
Dandeli Wildlife Sanctuary

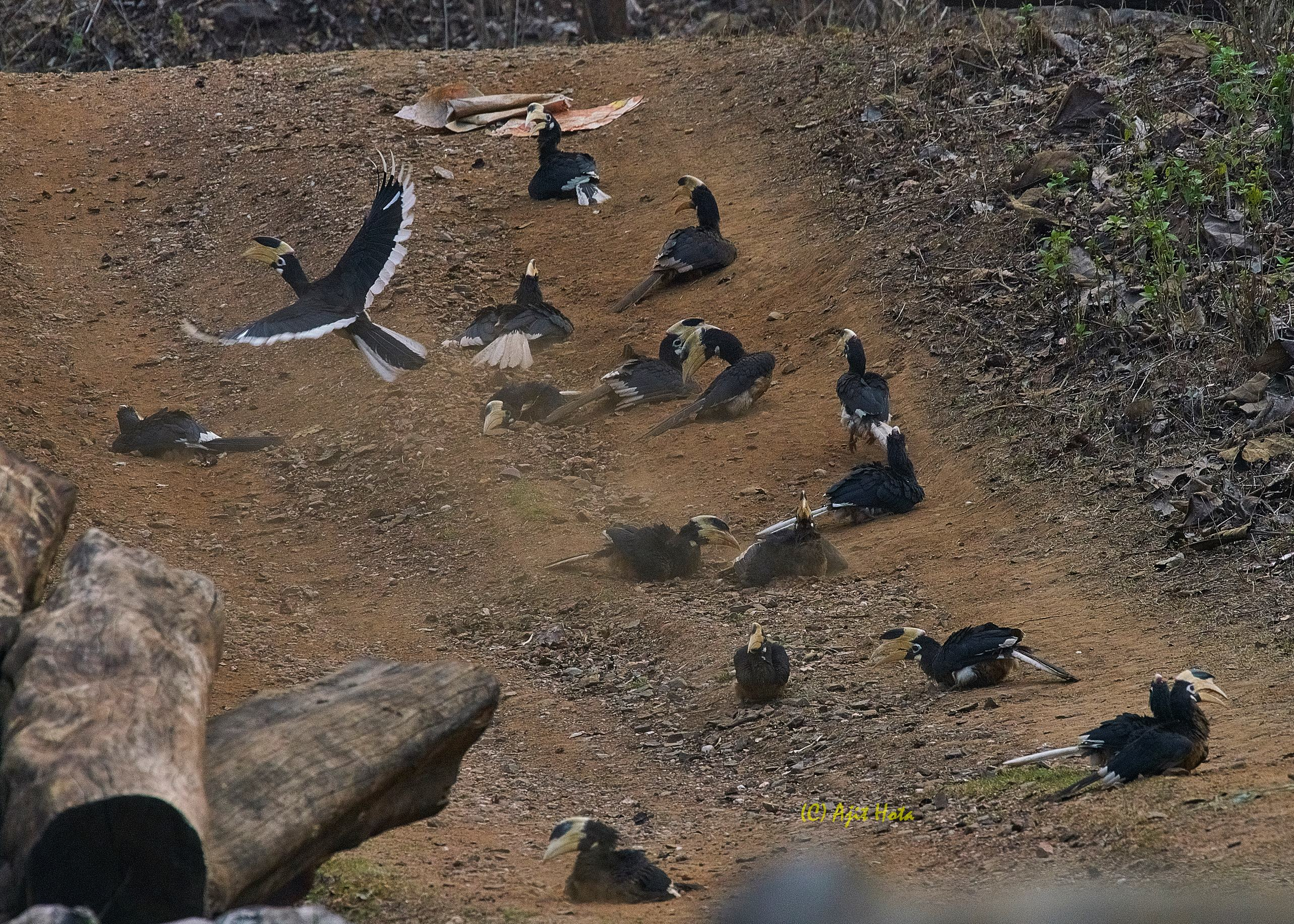
Dust bathing
Karnataka, India

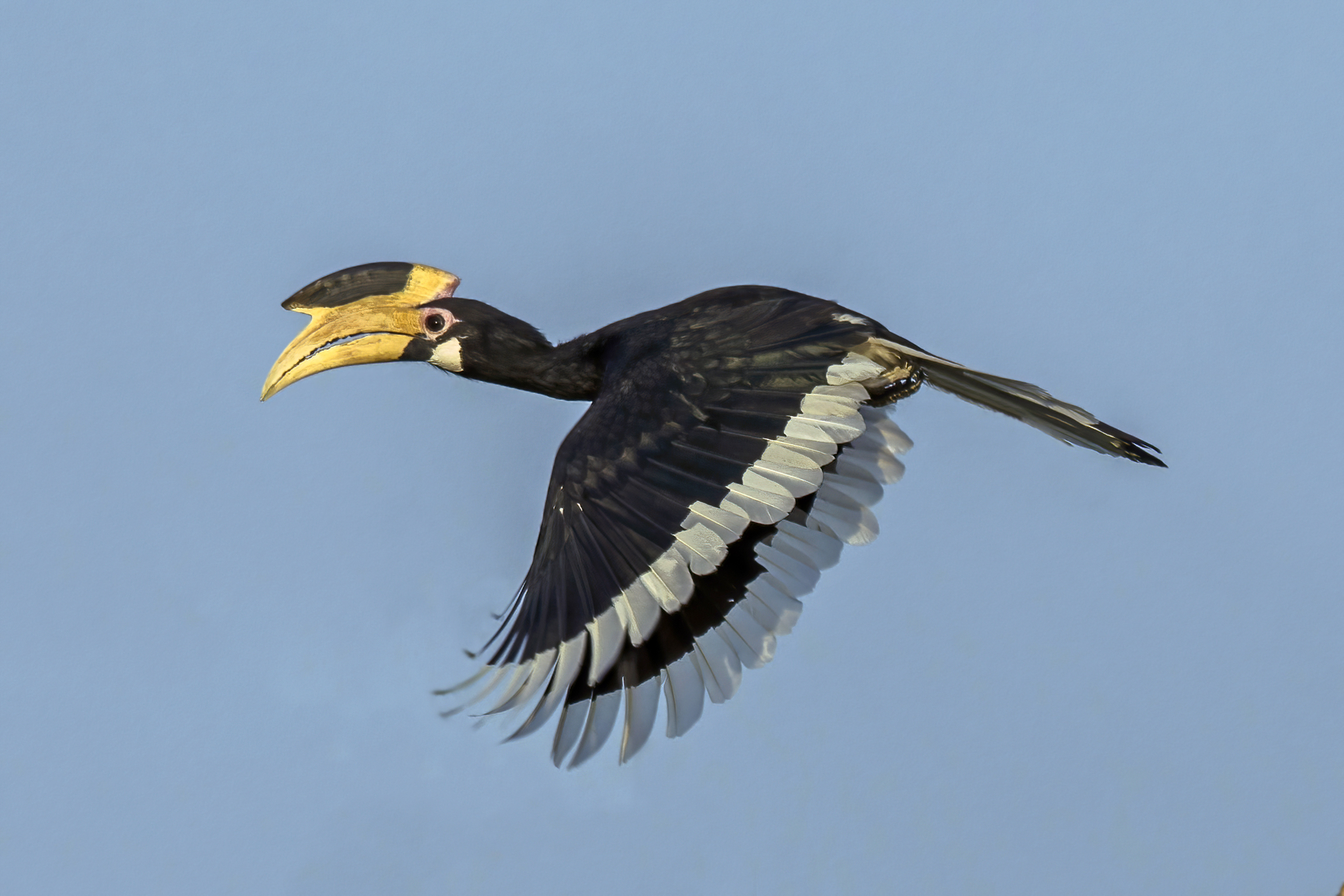
Female in flight
Yala National Park, Sri Lanka

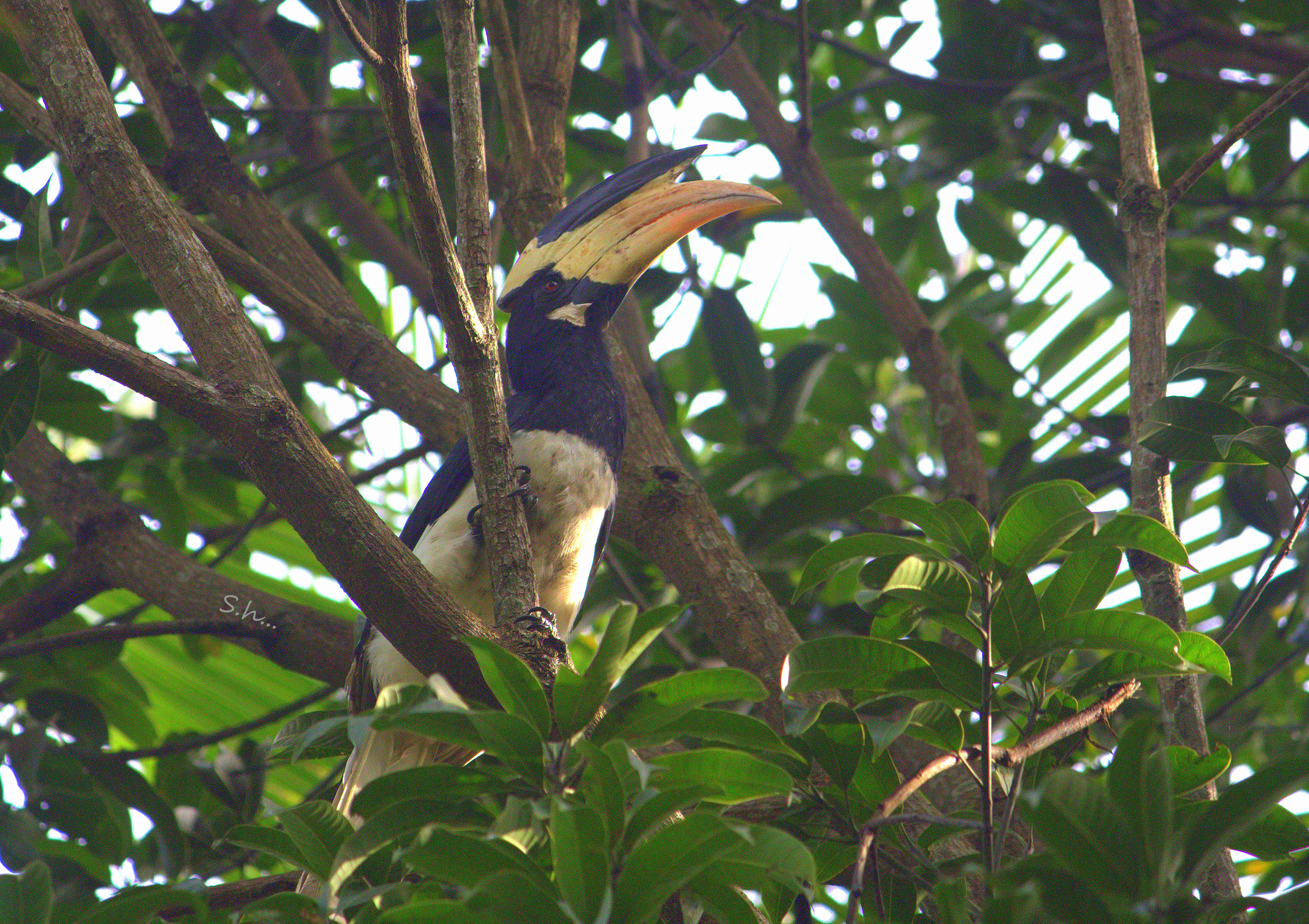
At Kumta, Karnataka
