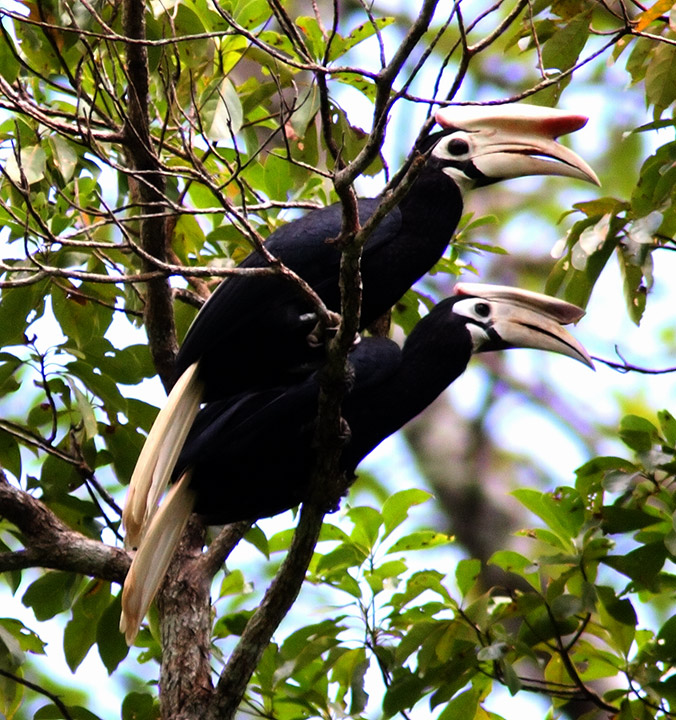

Conservation status
- Vulnerable (IUCN 3.1)
- CITES Appendix II

Scientific classification
- Kingdom: Animalia
- Phylum: Chordata
- Class: Aves
- Order: Bucerotiformes
- Family: Bucerotidae
- Genus: Anthracoceros
- Species: A. marchei

Binomial name
- Anthracoceros marchei Oustalet, 1885
- Palawan hornbill range

= Palawan hornbill =

Species of bird

The Palawan hornbill (Anthracoceros marchei) is a large forest bird endemic to the Philippines. It is one of the 11 endemic hornbills in the country. It is only found in Palawan and the nearby islands of Balabac, Busuanga, Calauit, Culion and Coron. It is locally known as "talusi" in the language Cuyunon. It is threatened by habitat loss, hunting and trapping for the cage-bird trade.

It is illegal to hunt, capture or possess these birds under Philippine Law RA 9147.

== Description and taxonomy ==
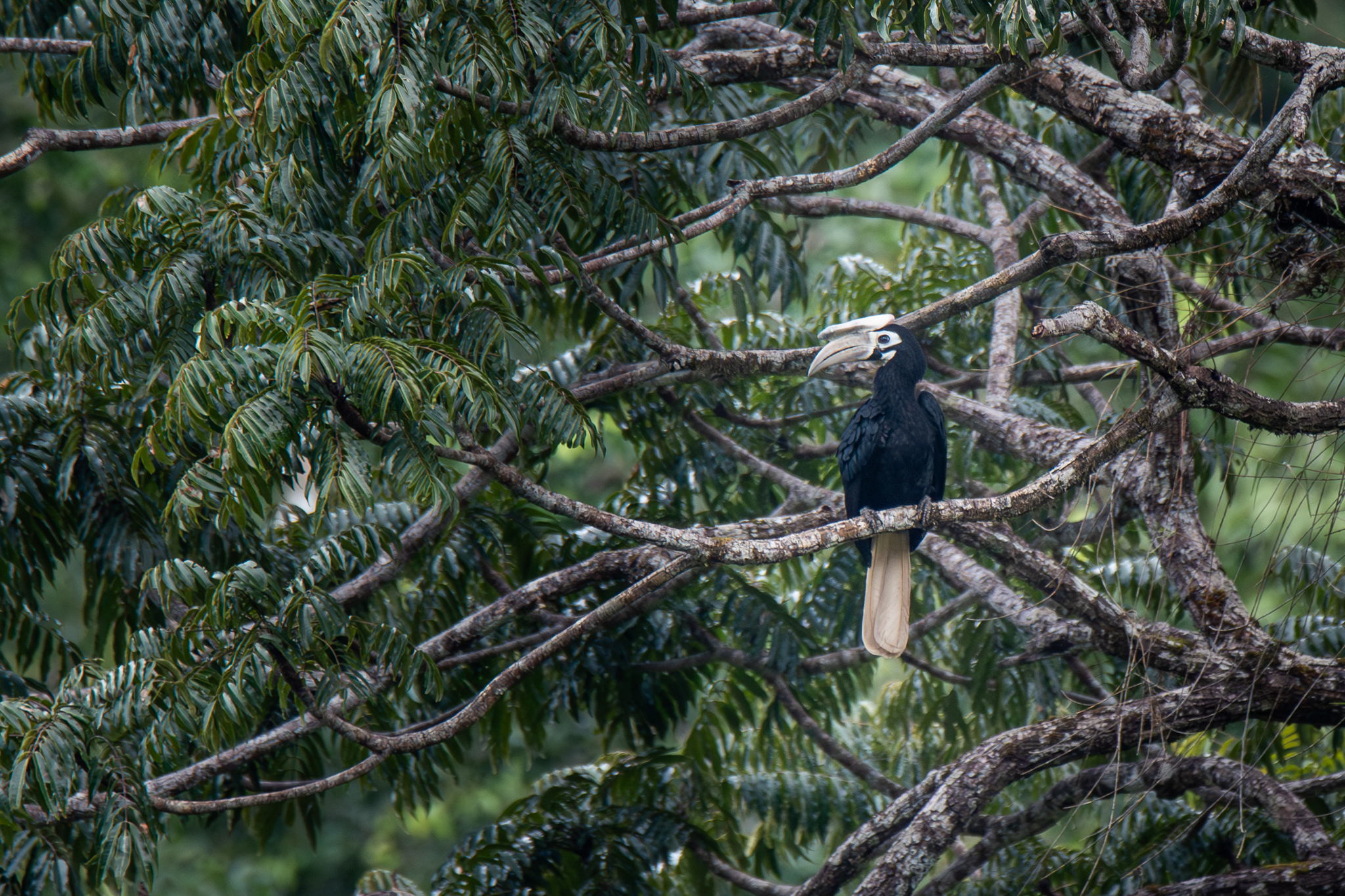
Palawan Hornbill

It's described as a large bird (approximately 70 centimetres (28 in) long, weighing 750 grams (26 oz), more than 92% of bird species) of lowland and foothill forest on Palawan and neighbouring islands. Its plumage is entirely black except for a white tail and a long, thick, pale cream-colored bill and casque. Whitish bare skin around the eyes and across the throat is tinged blue. Female has a smaller bill and casque. Unmistakable. The only hornbill in its range. Voice is a raucous cackling which can be transcribed as kaaww and kreik-kreik."

They exhibit sexual dimorphism in which males have more prominent casques and bills and an overall larger size than females.

Among the Philippine hornbills, it is most closely related to the Sulu hornbill but is differentiated by its white bill and face versus the Sulu hornbill's jet black features.

== Behaviour and ecology ==
The Palawan hornbill consumes mostly fruit, but also occasionally insects and vertebrates. Due to its large size and home range, it is an important vector of seed dispersal for large-seeded trees. Many ground-dwelling seed-eating mammals live beneath such trees, and in areas where hornbills have become rare, consume such a large percentage of the fallen seeds that they threaten the trees' survival.

It is usually seen in pairs or small noisy family groups, and it has a communal roosting site. It is most usually observed in fruiting trees at the forest edge, but it also feeds on insects and small reptiles.

== Habitat and conservation status ==
It inhabits primary and secondary dipterocarp forest, mangrove swamps and forest edge up to 900 meters above sea level. It has also occasionally been recorded visiting farmland and cultivations. It requires large trees for nesting. While they can tolerate secondary forest, they have the highest population densities and health in primary (old-growth) forest

It is officially classified as vulnerable with the population estimated, as of 2021, to be between 20,000 – 49,999 mature individuals. This population is decreasing, projected to decline by 31% over the species' next three generations due to habitat destruction, hunting for food, and the live bird trade. It is threatened by habitat destruction through logging, conversion into agricultural land or urban development and mining.

The species is present in conservation areas - the entirety of Palawan has been designated a biosphere reserve but actual protection and enforcement against logging and hunting has been difficult. There are populations in several other protected areas such as Puerto Princesa Subterranean River National Park, El Nido Marine Reserve and others. It is listed in CITES as Appendix II.

Conservation actions proposed include surveys in the remaining lowland forests throughout its range, and getting a better understanding of the scope and impact of illegal capture for the bird trade on the species. More research on the species' needs for successful nesting is needed, and an expansion of protected areas within its range (notably, Puerto Princesa Subterranean River National Park) would be ideal.
