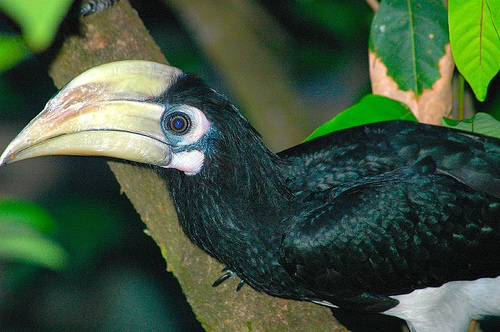
- Oriental pied hornbill (Anthracoceros albirostris)

Scientific classification
- Kingdom: Animalia
- Phylum: Chordata
- Class: Aves
- Order: Bucerotiformes
- Family: Bucerotidae
- Genus: Anthracoceros; Reichenbach, 1849

Type species
- Buceros monoceros Shaw, 1811

Species
- Anthracoceros coronatus Anthracoceros albirostris Anthracoceros malayanus Anthracoceros marchei Anthracoceros montani

= Anthracoceros =

Genus of birds

Anthracoceros is a genus of birds in the family Bucerotidae.

The genus was introduced by the German naturalist Ludwig Reichenbach in 1849. The type species was subsequently designated as the Malabar pied hornbill (Anthracoceros coronatus). The genus name comes from Ancient Greek ἄνθραξ (ánthrax), meaning "coal", and κέρας (kéras), meaning "horn". A molecular phylogenetic study published in 2013 found that Anthracoceros was sister to the genus Ocyceros which contains the three grey hornbill species.

The genus contains five species:

Image	Scientific name	Common name	Distribution
	Anthracoceros coronatus	Malabar pied hornbill	India and Sri Lanka
	Anthracoceros albirostris	Oriental pied hornbill	Bangladesh, Bhutan, Brunei, Cambodia, China (Guangxi, Yunnan and Tibet), Eastern and Northern India, Indonesia, Laos, Malaysia, Myanmar, Nepal, Singapore, Thailand and Vietnam
	Anthracoceros malayanus	Black hornbill	Asia in Brunei Darussalam, Indonesia, Malaysia, Singapore, Thailand.
	Anthracoceros marchei	Palawan hornbill	Greater Palawan, Philippines
	Anthracoceros montani	Sulu hornbill	Greater Sulu, Philippines
