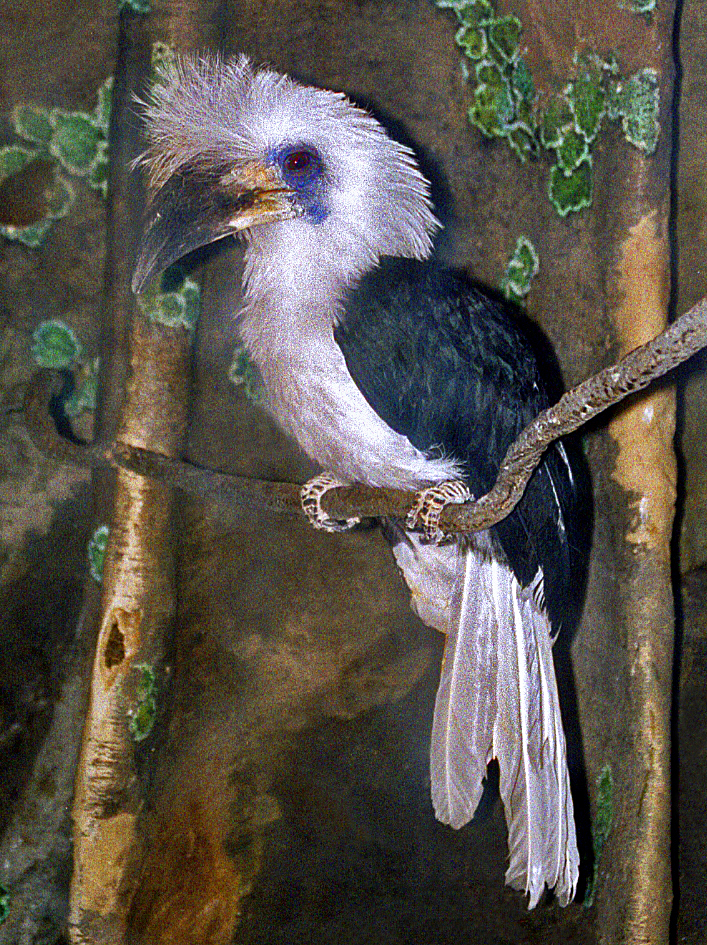
- Male

Conservation status
- Endangered (IUCN 3.1)
- CITES Appendix II

Scientific classification
- Kingdom: Animalia
- Phylum: Chordata
- Class: Aves
- Order: Bucerotiformes
- Family: Bucerotidae
- Genus: Berenicornis; Bonaparte, 1850
- Species: B. comatus

Binomial name
- Berenicornis comatus (Raffles, 1822)

Synonyms
- Aceros comatus

= White-crowned hornbill =

Species of bird

The white-crowned hornbill (Berenicornis comatus), also known as the long-crested hornbill or white-crested hornbill (leading to easy confusion with the African white-crested hornbill), is a species of hornbill.

== Taxonomy ==
It is monotypic within the genus Berenicornis, although rarely the white-crested hornbill is also included in this genus, and the white-crowned hornbill is sometimes placed in genus Aceros instead.

== Description ==
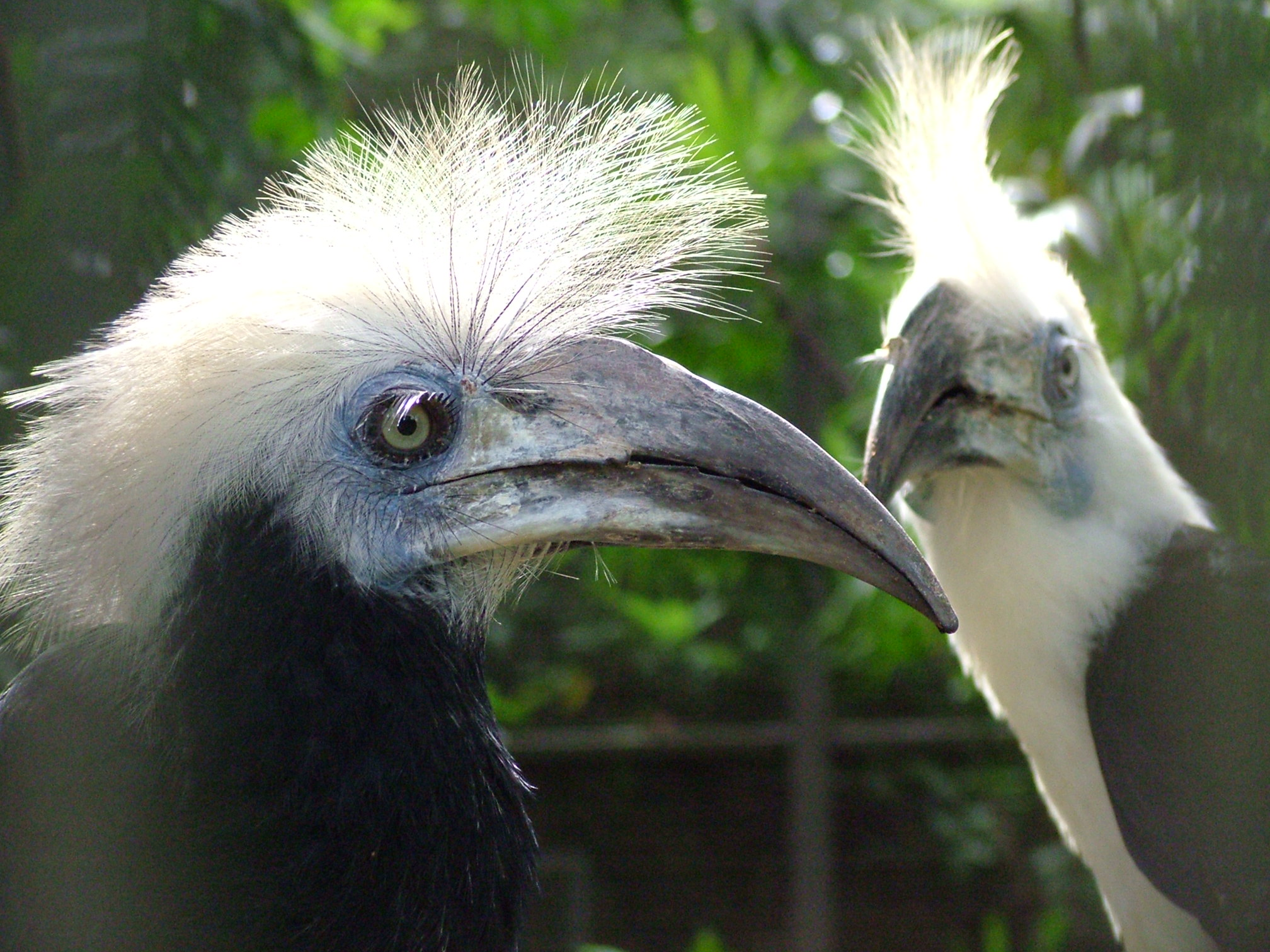
Berenicornis comatus. Close-up on the heads of male (right) and female (left)

Berenicornis comatus is a large hornbill, reaching a length of 83–102 cm (33–40 in) and a weight of 1.3–1.5 kg (2.9–3.3 lb). Females are smaller than males. The plumage is black and white. The head, neck, breast and tail are white, while the remaining plumage is black. It has white crown feathers erected in a crest (hence the common name). Between the eye and the bill and on the throat there is bare dark blue skin. The bill is mainly black, with a yellowish base. Like most hornbills, it has a blackish casque on the top of its bill. The female has a black neck and underparts.

== Diet ==
These birds are territorial and feed on various fruits, lizards, arthropods and larvae.

== Distribution ==
This species is found in the Malay Peninsula, Sumatra and Borneo.

== Habitat ==
This bird inhabits rainforests at low and medium altitudes, usually at an elevation below 900 meters. It may also be found on fruit, oil-palm and rubber plantations. It is threatened by habitat destruction.

== Behavior ==
The female lays two white eggs in a tree hole, then seals herself in by blocking the entrance to the nest with droppings, debris and mud. The male, and other adults and young forming a cooperative group, feed the breeding female and the chicks through a narrow hole. The female breaks the "wall" and leaves the nest when the chicks are able to fly.

== Threats ==
The forest habitat that this bird depends on has been heavily declining in recent years. Due to this, the white-crowned hornbill was uplisted from near threatened to endangered on the IUCN Red List in 2018.
