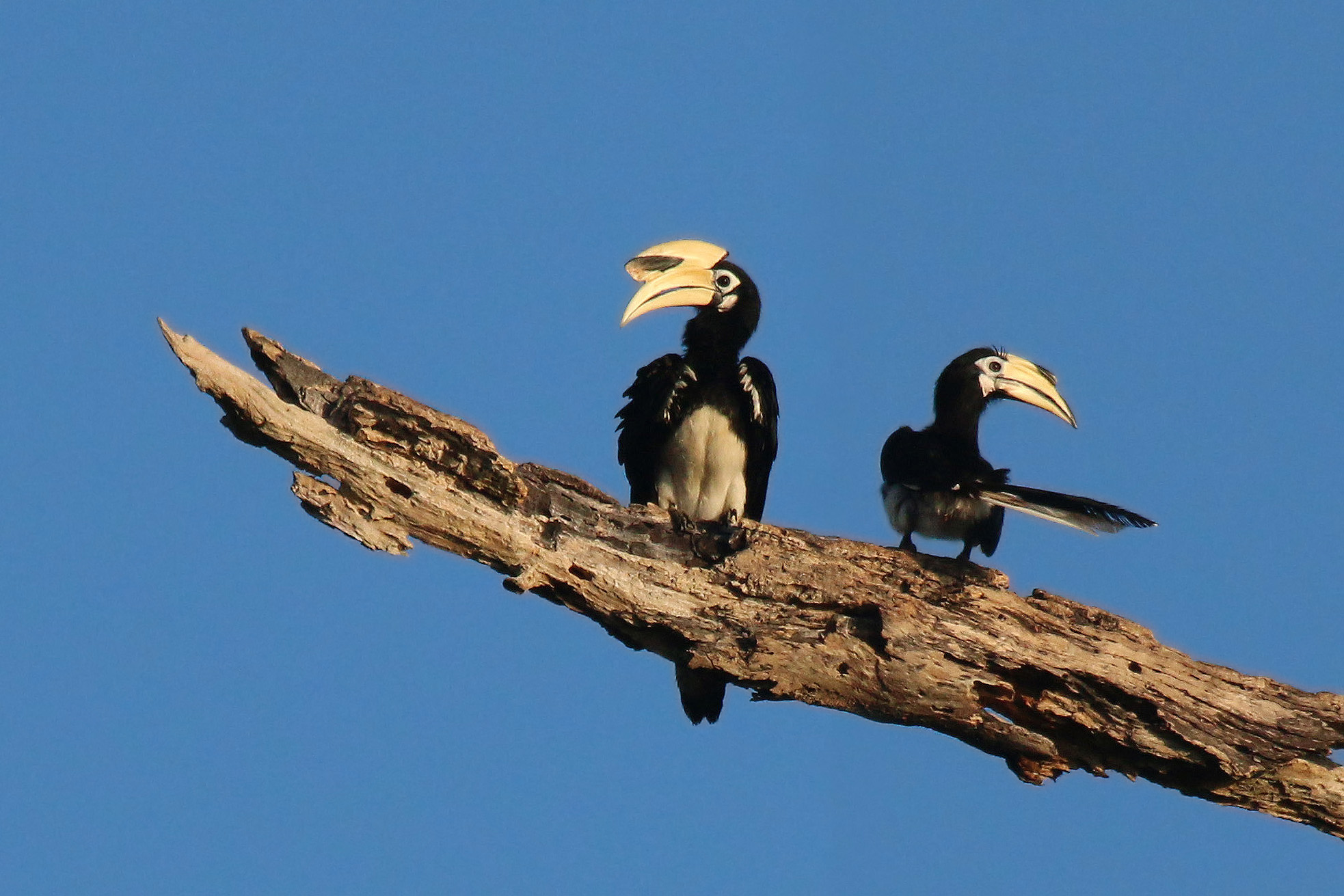
- Male (left) and female (right); Kinabatangan River, Borneo

Conservation status
- Least Concern (IUCN 3.1)
- CITES Appendix II

Scientific classification
- Kingdom: Animalia
- Phylum: Chordata
- Class: Aves
- Order: Bucerotiformes
- Family: Bucerotidae
- Genus: Anthracoceros
- Species: A. albirostris

Binomial name
- Anthracoceros albirostris (Shaw, 1808)

= Oriental pied hornbill =

Species of bird

The oriental pied hornbill (Anthracoceros albirostris) is an Indo-Malayan pied hornbill, a large canopy-dwelling bird belonging to the family Bucerotidae. Two other common names for this species are Sunda pied hornbill (convexus) and Malaysian pied hornbill.

The oriental pied hornbill is considered to be among the smallest and most common of the Asian hornbills. It has the largest distribution in the genus and occurs in the Indian subcontinent and throughout Southeast Asia. Its natural habitat is subtropical or tropical moist lowland forests. Its diet includes fruit, insects, shellfish, small reptiles and small mammals and birds including their eggs.

== Taxonomy ==
The Oriental hornbill, of the family Bucerotidae, belongs to the genus Anthracoceros, which consists of five species. Species in this genus are divided into two groups, Indo-Malayan pied hornbills and black hornbills. A. albirostris is grouped under the Indo-Malayan pied hornbills, based on plumage similarities, along with the Indian pied hornbill (A. coronatus) and the Palawan hornbill (A. marchei). The black hornbills include A. malayanus and A. montani. A. albirostris can be further categorized into two subspecies, A. a. albirostris and A. a. convexus.

== Description ==
The oriental pied hornbill is a medium size frugivore with a head-to-tail length of 55–60 cm (22–24 in) and a wingspan of 23–36 cm (9.1–14.2 in). The bill measures 19 cm (7.5 in) for males and 16 cm (6.3 in) for females. It can weigh between 600 and 1,050 g (21 and 37 oz), averaging 900 g (32 oz) for males and 875 g (30.9 oz) for females. The plumage of the head, neck, back, wings and upper breast is black with a slight green sheen. The tail is black with white tips on all the feathers except the central feathers (rectories). The plumage of their lower breast, lower abdomen, thighs, under-wing and all the tips of the wings except the three basal secondaries and two outer primaries is white, as is the circumorbital skin around the eyes and on the throat skin. A blue tinge can sometimes be noticed on the throat of adults. Casques of mature oriental pied hornbills are laterally flattened "cylinders", which may form a protruding horn. Males and females are similar in coloration. Males can be distinguished from females by their larger body size, yellow bill, which has a black base, and bright red eyes. Females have a slightly smaller body size, a yellow bill and casque with a partly black, browned patched mandible, and grayish-brown eyes. Juvenile oriental pied hornbills resemble the adults, but have an undeveloped casque and a smaller bill. Their black plumage lacks the green gloss found on adults.

The calls of the oriental pied hornbill have been described as crowlike sounds, braying sounds or harsh crackles and screeches.

== Distribution and habitat ==
The oriental pied hornbill has the largest distribution of the genus and occurs in the Indian subcontinent and throughout Southeast Asia. Its range encompasses eastern and northern India, Nepal, Pakistan, Bangladesh, Bhutan, Tibet, Myanmar, Thailand, Laos, Cambodia, Vietnam, Peninsular Malaysia, Singapore, Indonesia, Brunei and the Sunda shelf islands. Its natural habitat is subtropical or tropical moist lowland forests including dry and semi-evergreen forests, dry and moist deciduous forests, subtropical broadleaf forests, secondary forests, plantations and woodlands.

== Behaviour and ecology ==
=== Feeding ===
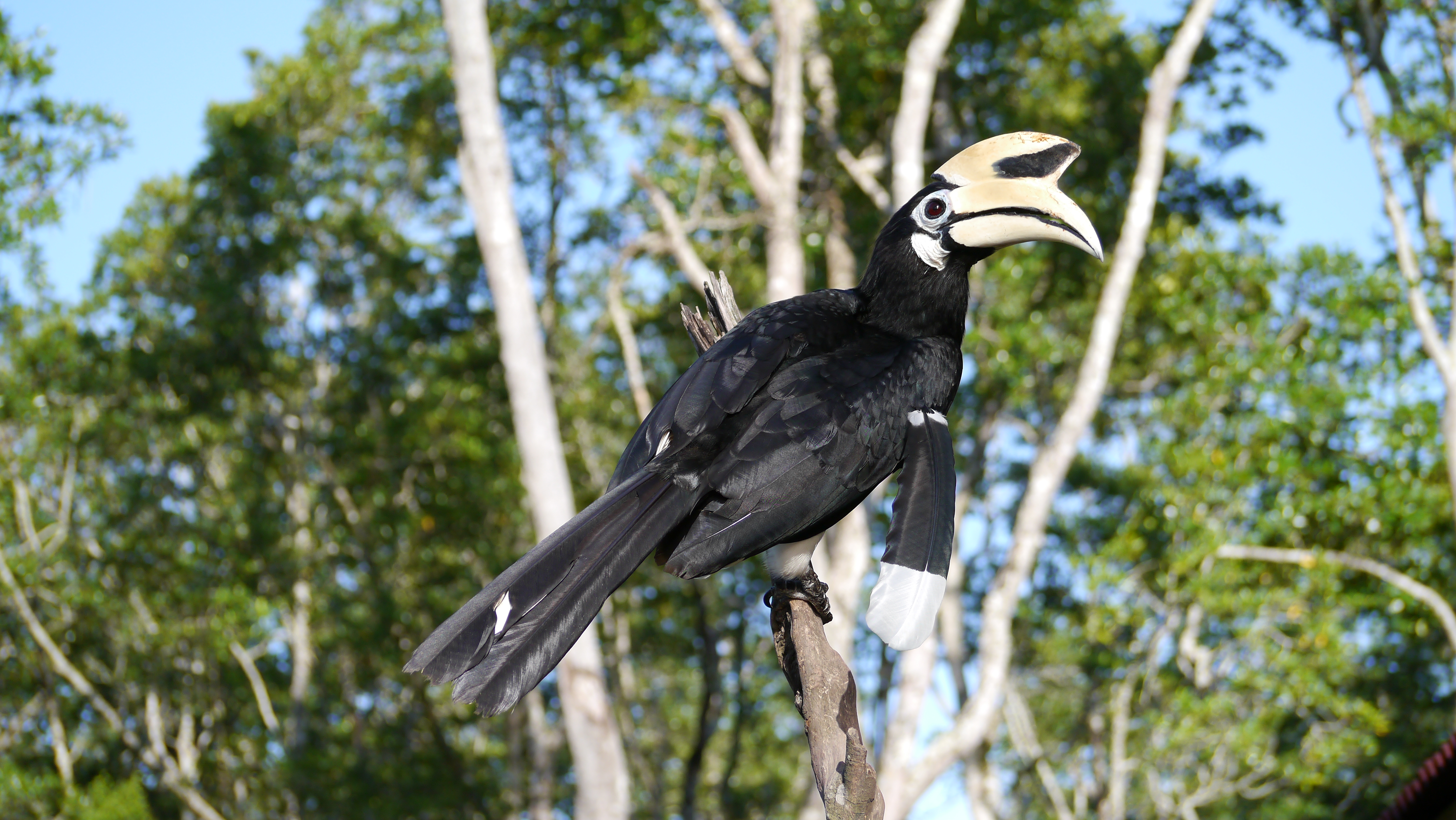
In Labuk Bay Proboscis Monkeys Sanctuary, Sabah, Malaysia

Hornbills are predominantly frugivores. The oriental pied hornbill's diet consists of wild fruits such as figs (Ficus spp.), melanoxylon berries, rambutans, palm fruit, papaya and fruits of liana plants. It will also take large insects (grasshoppers), small birds (finches), small reptiles (lizards and snakes), amphibians such as frogs, fish, and bats. Its diet differs slightly between the breeding and non-breeding season. During the non-breeding season, oriental pied hornbills feed more on non-fig fruit such as small sized berries, drupes, arillate capsules and lianas (woody vines), however the availability of these food items is lower in the breeding season, which suggests that the species increases its habitat range during that time. They were also observed predating on nests of other birds and preying on eggs and hatchlings. They also tend to feed in flocks during the non breeding season. When foraging for food, they tend to select a few common species of fruit trees. They show a preference towards trees belonging to the families Annonaceae, Meliaceae and Myristicaceae. Other target species include Rourea minor, Polyalthia viridis, Cinnamomum subavenium, Trichosanthes tricuspidata, and many others. Feeding on a diversity of fruits ensure that nutritional requirements are met. In the non-breeding season fruits that are selected for are generally sugar rich, while lipid-rich fruits and invertebrates are highly selected for during the breeding season.

Oriental pied hornbills are important large seed dispersers, promoting seedling recruitment by translocating the seeds of the fruits they feed on. Few other bird species outside the hornbill family have large enough gape widths to allow them to disperse large seeds to special microsites or open habitats. Seed dispersal behavior of hornbills thus helps shape forest communities, and disruption of this animal-plant interaction may have significant impacts on the reshaping of forest communities.

=== Reproduction ===
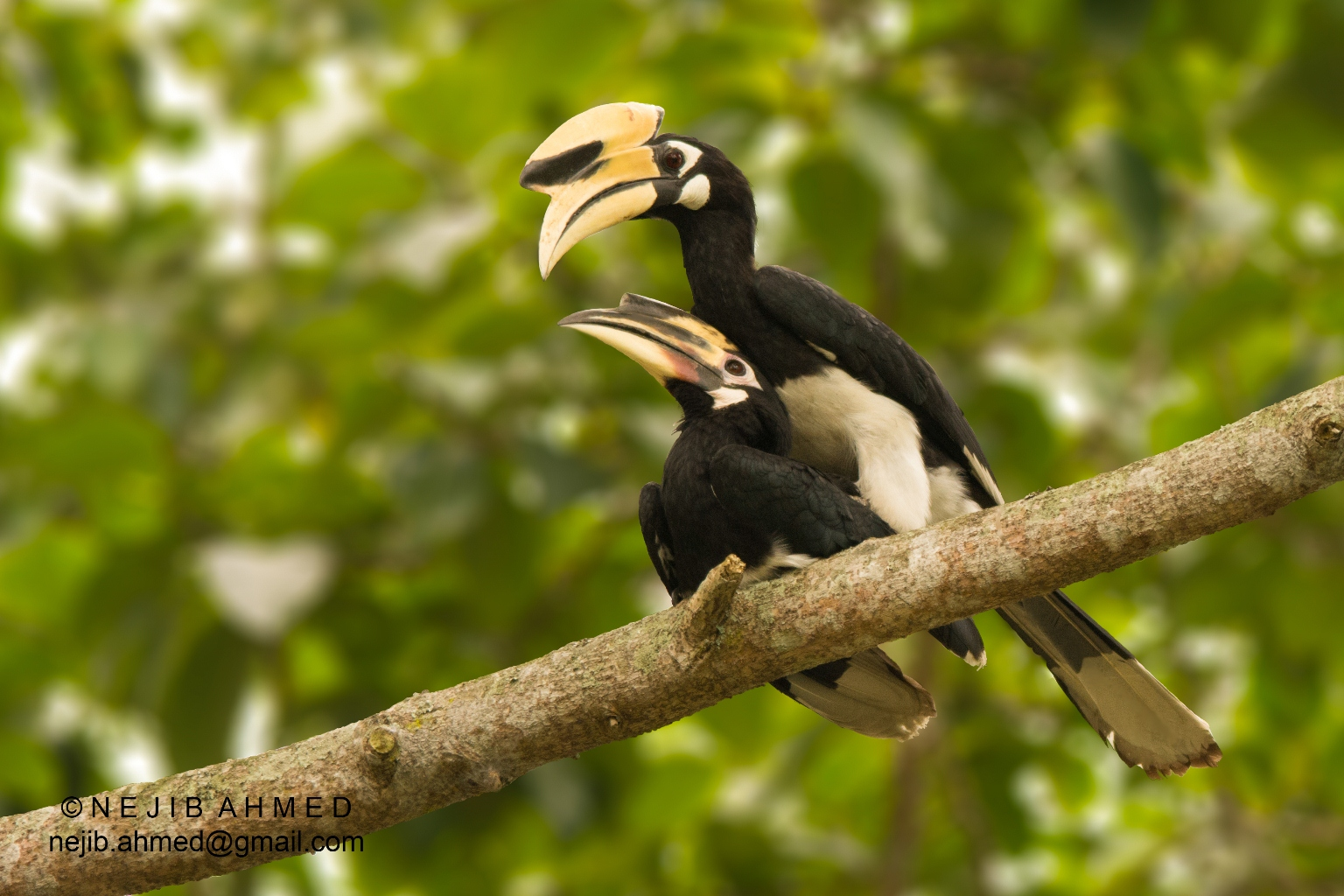
Hornbills mating in Kaziranga National Park

Hornbills are generally monogamous and breed between January and June; oriental pied hornbills typically commence breeding in February. This coincides with the onset of rain depending on geographic location, and peak abundance of fruit.

Hornbills are secondary cavity nesters, meaning that they typically do not excavate their own nesting sites but use those created by other birds or by branches breaking off. Because hornbills rely on pre-excavated cavities, selection of suitable nest-sites within their environment has major impacts on breeding success. When females have selected and entered their nest, they seal the cavity with a mixture of saliva, mud, fruit, droppings and tree bark, leaving only a small opening through which food may be passed in. The male forages for the female and chicks, and the female feeds the nestlings. Chicks remain inside the nest with the female for several months until they are ready to fledge. Oriental pied hornbills have shown to return to their previous nest for subsequent nesting seasons.

=== Nest selection ===
Hornbills select nest sites based on the availability and type of fruiting trees, as well as on the availability and quality of nest site cavities in their particular habitat. Some oriental pied hornbills have demonstrated tree species preferences for nest site selection. In Rajaji National Park in India, oriental pied hornbills nest in a variety of tree species such as Bombax ceiba, Careya arborea, Cordia myxa, Lagerstroemia parviflora, Mitragyma parviflora, Terminalia belerica, Shorea robusta, and Syzigium cumini.

The main difference in the structural characteristics of nest cavities between hornbill species is cavity size, which is highly correlated with body size. Cavities preferred by the oriental pied hornbill are elongate and may be located at a height between 1–18 m or more. Cavity entrance shape is rounder than for other hornbills. Oriental pied hornbills tend to select nesting sites in close proximity to rivers or other bodies of water. Compared to other hornbill species such as the great pied hornbill and wreathed hornbill, the oriental pied hornbill demonstrates tolerance to disturbed habitats. Nests have been found in disturbed, secondary forest areas such as plantations, degraded forests and logging sites, while other hornbill species tend to avoid such sites. Nests found in human disturbed areas are however often unsuccessful or abandoned; in general, hornbills prefer undisturbed forest areas.

Because oriental pied hornbills inhabit various habitats, nest structural characteristics may vary from one habitat to another, and may also vary between hornbill species, which have overlapping habitats. Habitat overlap among hornbill species may lead to intra & inter specific competition, whereby hornbills compete for limited nest-sites. Competition for nest-sites with other species such as squirrels, lizard and other cavity nesting birds can also have critical impacts on breeding success.

== Conservation ==
The species has an extremely wide range and appears to be the hornbill species most adaptable to habitat alterations; it is thus not currently considered to be threatened. What declines in oriental pied hornbill population have been reported are mainly caused by legal and illegal logging, which decreases the availability of suitable nesting and fruiting trees. A. albirostris are subject to some hunting pressure (casques are sold as souvenirs) and are popular as pets in some areas. It has also been noted that the species has been almost completely extirpated from southern China. In Singapore, the local population went locally extinct in the 1960s, but bounced back in the 1990s and hornbills are now widespread around the island. The Singaporean population appears to regularly eat eggs or chicks from other bird nests, possibly an adaptation to an urban environment with less fruit but more exposed bird nests.

Conservation efforts such as captive breeding and reintroduction are currently in practice. Breeding in captivity has so far shown a low success rate. In some areas, such as Cambodia, artificial nests made from iron tanks are installed in nesting sites to provide alternative nesting sites for hornbills when natural nest-site availability is low and to aid reintroduction.
