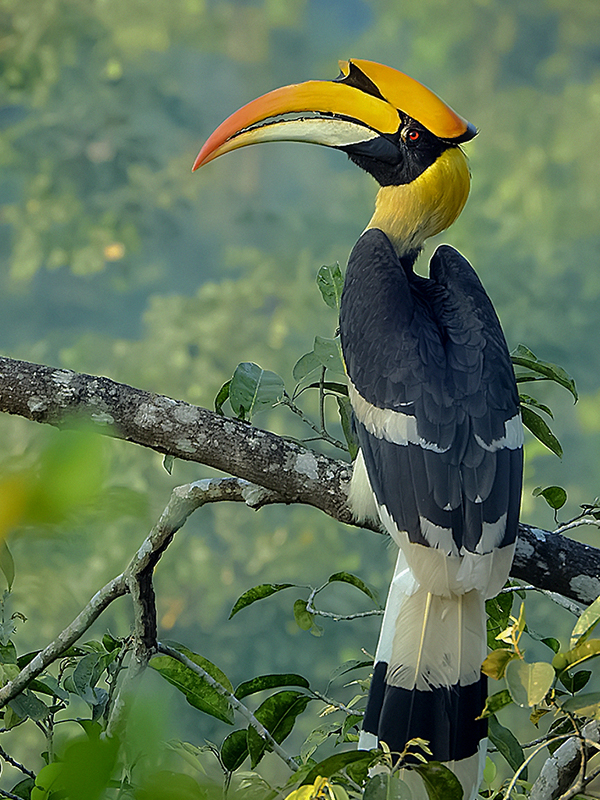
- Great hornbill Buceros bicornis from Mangaon, Raigad, Maharashtra, India

Scientific classification
- Kingdom: Animalia
- Phylum: Chordata
- Class: Aves
- Order: Bucerotiformes
- Family: Bucerotidae; Rafinesque, 1815

Genera
- 16, see text
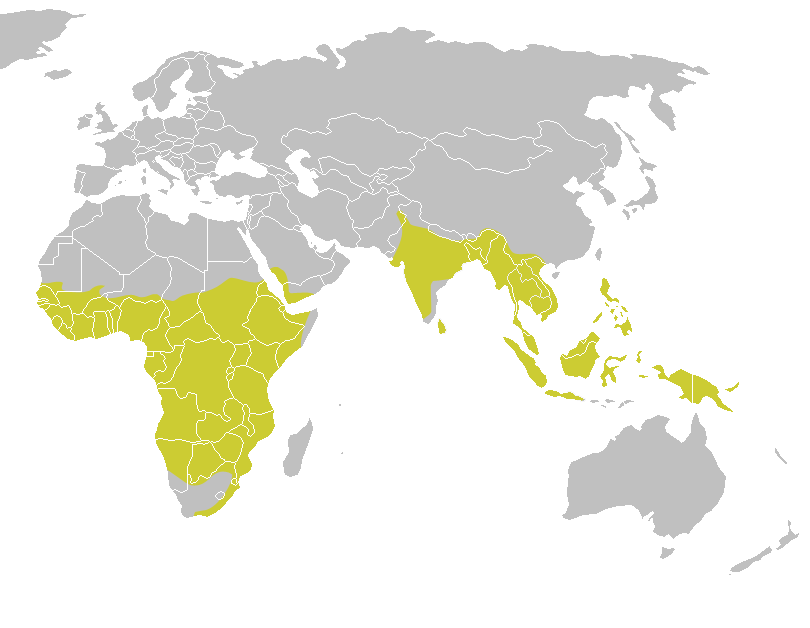
- Range of all hornbill species

= Hornbill =

Hornbill Temporal range: Early Miocene – Recent

Family of birds

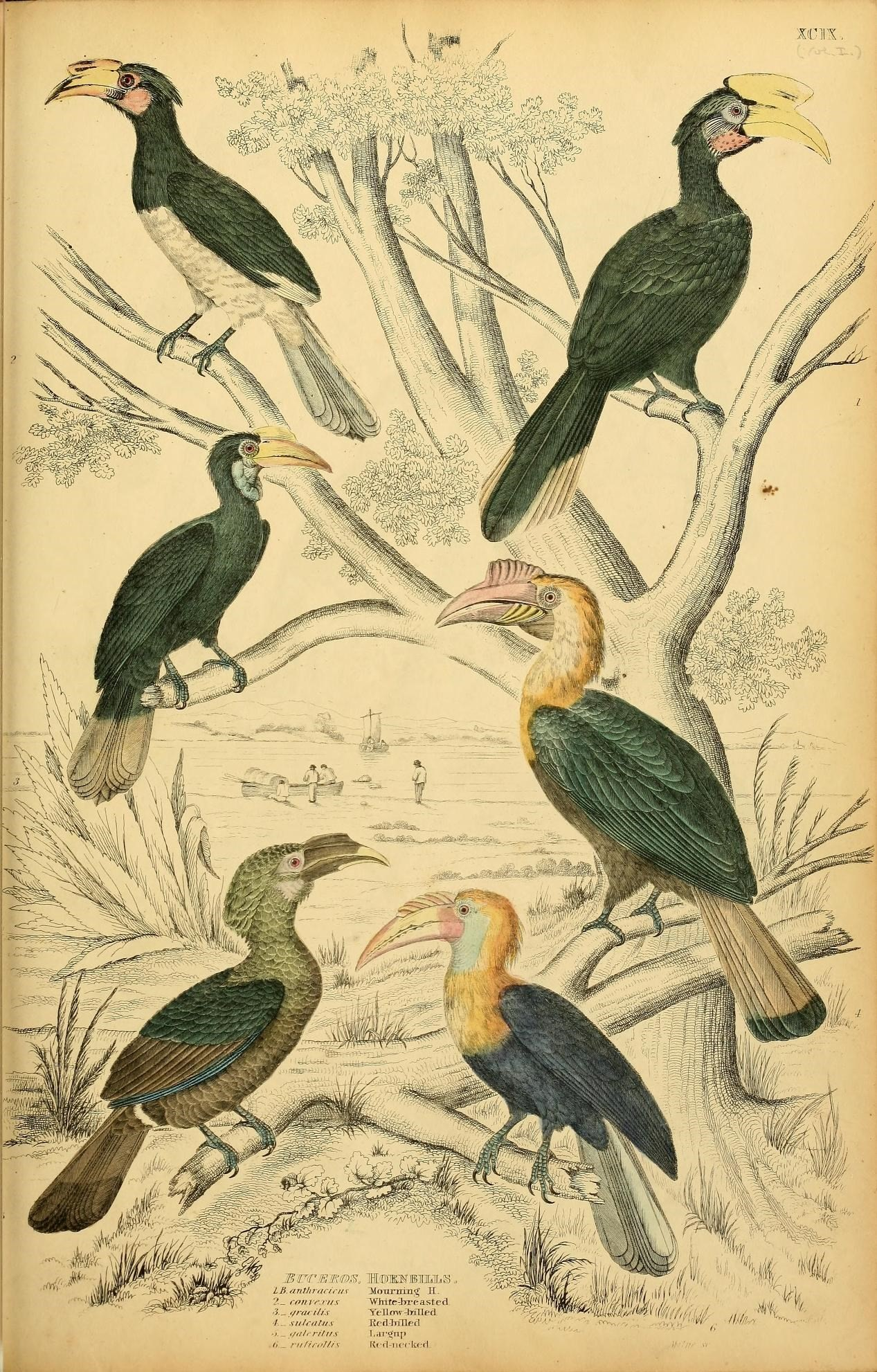
Illustration of Hornbills, c.1835-1840

Hornbills are birds found in tropical and subtropical Africa, Asia and Melanesia of the family Bucerotidae. They are characterized by a long, down-curved bill which is frequently brightly coloured and sometimes has a horny casque on the upper mandible. Hornbills have a two-lobed kidney. They are the only birds in which the first and second neck vertebrae (the atlas and axis respectively) are fused together; this probably provides a more stable platform for carrying the bill. The family is omnivorous, feeding on fruit and small animals. They are monogamous breeders nesting in natural cavities in trees and sometimes cliffs. A number of mainly insular species of hornbill with small ranges are threatened with extinction, mainly in Southeast Asia.

In the Neotropical realm, toucans occupy the hornbills' ecological niche, an example of convergent evolution. Despite their close appearances, the two groups are not very closely related, with toucans being related to several families of barbet, while hornbills (and their close relatives, the ground hornbills) are allied with the hoopoes and wood-hoopoes.

== Description ==
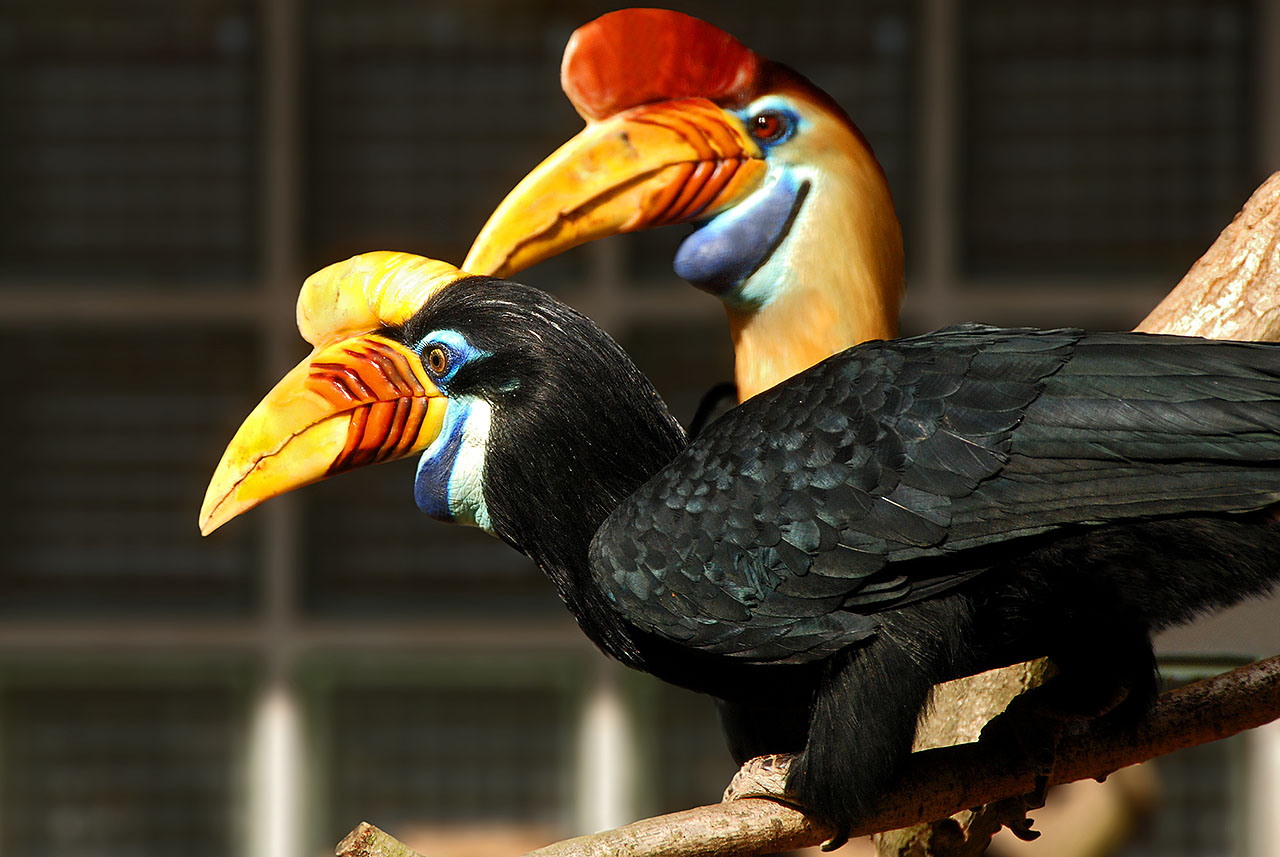
The brightest colours on most hornbills, like this pair of knobbed hornbills, are found on the beaks and bare skin of the face and throat.

Hornbills show considerable variation in size and colors. The smallest species is the black dwarf hornbill (Tockus hartlaubi), at 99.1 g (3.50 oz) and 32 cm (1 ft 1 in) in length. The largest and most massive species appears to be the southern ground hornbill which has an average weight of 3.77 kg (8.3 lb), and can weigh up to 6.3 kg (14 lb) and span about 180 cm (5 ft 11 in) across the wings. Other species rival the southern ground species in length, at up to about 130 cm (4 ft 3 in), including the Abyssinian ground hornbill (Bucorvus abyssinicus), the great hornbill (Buceros bicornis) and, probably the longest of all (perhaps exceeding 150 cm (4 ft 11 in)) thanks in part to its extended tail feathers, the helmeted hornbill (Rhinoplax vigil). Males are always bigger than the females, though the extent to which this is true varies according to species. The extent of sexual dimorphism also varies with body parts. For example, the difference in body mass between males and females is 1–17%, but the variation is 8–30% for bill length and 1–21% in wing length.

The most distinctive feature of the hornbills is the heavy bill, supported by powerful neck muscles as well as by the fused vertebrae. The large bill assists in fighting, preening, constructing the nest, and catching prey. A feature unique to the hornbills is the casque, a hollow structure that runs along the upper mandible. In some species it is barely perceptible and appears to serve no function beyond reinforcing the bill. In other species it is quite large, is reinforced with bone, and has openings between the hollow centre, allowing it to serve as a resonator for calls. In the helmeted hornbill the casque is not hollow but is filled with hornbill ivory and is used as a battering ram in dramatic aerial jousts. Aerial casque-butting has also been reported in the great hornbill.

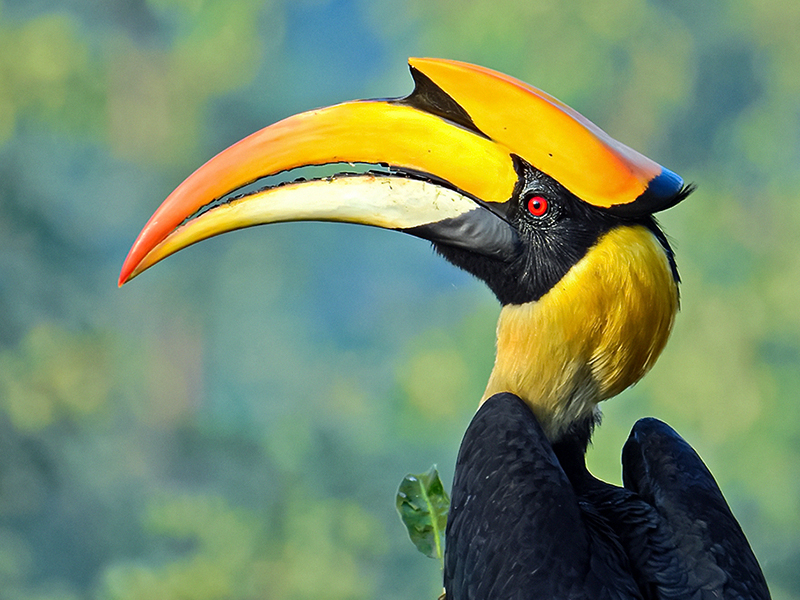
Close-up of great hornbill

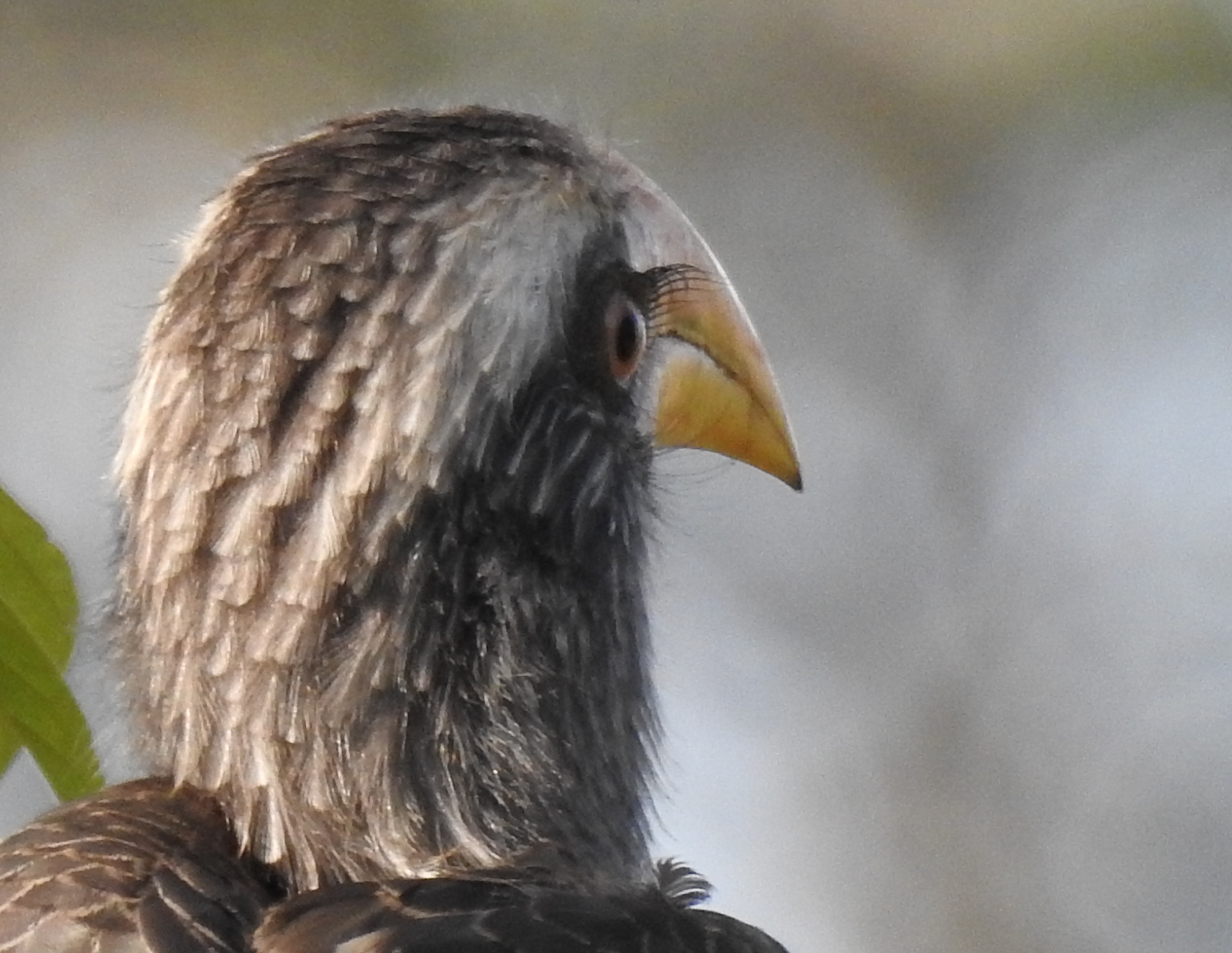
Close-up of head of a Malabar grey hornbill showing eyelashes

The plumage of hornbills is typically black, grey, white, or brown, and is frequently offset by bright colours on the bill, or by patches of bare coloured skin on the face or wattles. Some species exhibit sexual dichromatism, where the colouration of soft parts varies by sex. Hornbills possess binocular vision, although unlike most birds with this type of vision, the bill intrudes on their visual field. This allows them to see their own bill tip and aids in precision handling of food objects with their bill. The eyes are also protected by large eyelashes which act as a sunshade.

== Distribution and habitat ==
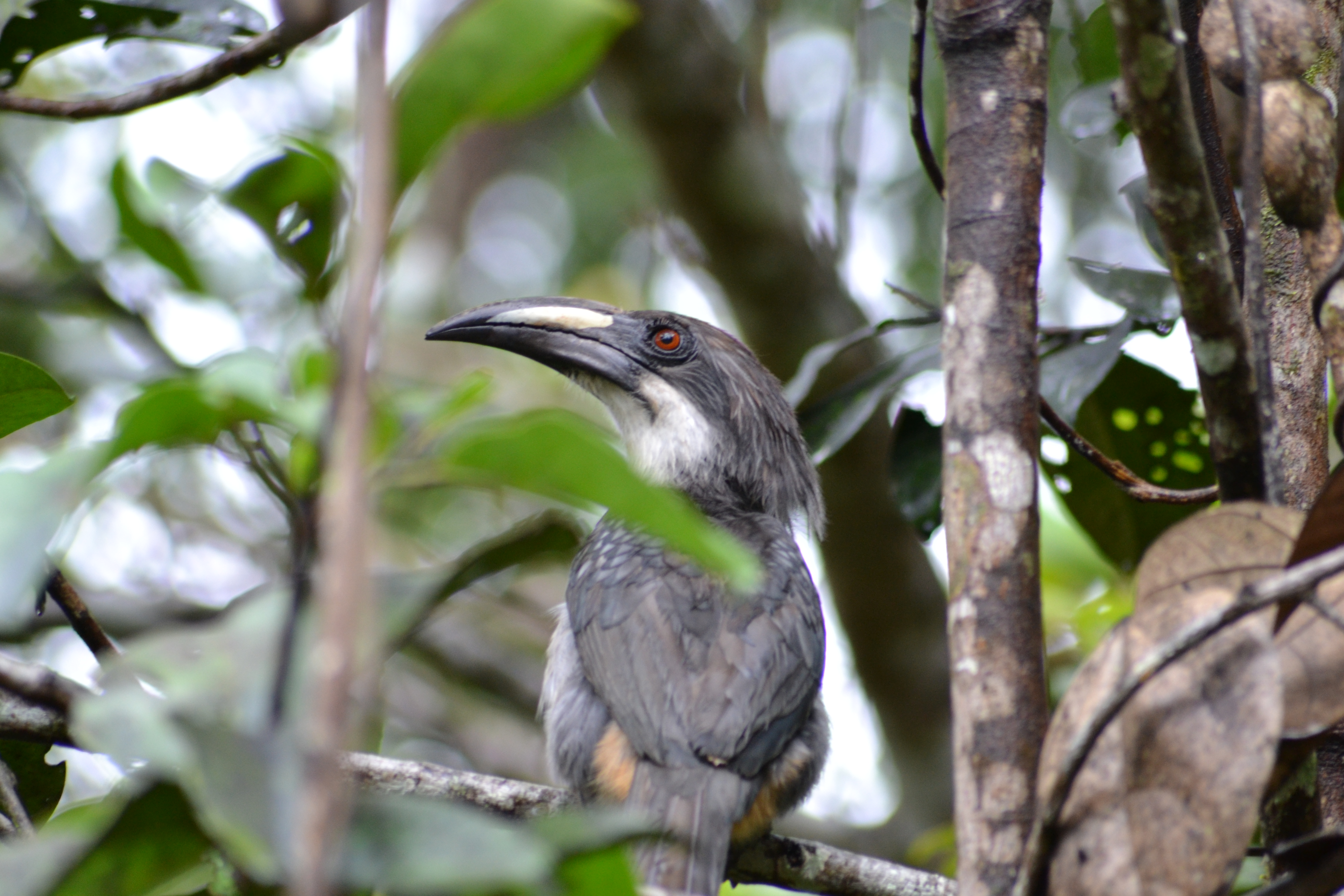
As its name suggests, the Sri Lanka grey hornbill is grey and endemic to Sri Lanka.

The Bucerotidae include about 62 living species, though a number of cryptic species may yet be split, as has been suggested for the red-billed hornbill. Their distribution includes Sub-Saharan Africa and the Indian subcontinent to the Philippines and the Solomon Islands, but no genus is found in both Africa and Asia. Most are arboreal birds, but the large ground hornbills (Bucorvus), as their name implies, are terrestrial birds of open savanna. Of the 24 species found in Africa, 13 are birds of the more open woodlands and savanna, and some occur even in highly arid environments; the remaining species are found in dense forests. This contrasts with Asia, where a single species occurs in open savanna and the remainder are forest species. The Indian subcontinent has 10 species of hornbills, of which 9 are found in India and adjoining countries, while the Sri Lanka grey hornbill is restricted to the island. The most common widespread species in the Indian subcontinent is the Indian grey hornbill. According to the International Union for Conservation of Nature (IUCN), Indonesia has 13 hornbill species: 9 of them exist in Sumatra, and the rest exist in Sumba, Sulawesi, Papua and Kalimantan. Kalimantan has the same hornbill species as Sumatra, except that the great hornbill is not found there. Meanwhile, the neighboring archipelago of the Philippines has 11 hornbill species, all of which are endemic to certain small islands of the country, making them one of the most endangered hornbills in the world. In the Neogene (at least in the late Miocene), hornbills inhabited North Africa and South Europe. Their remains have been found in Morocco and Bulgaria. The oldest known hornbill is from the Early Miocene of Uganda, around 19 million years ago, which is similar to modern Tockus.

== Behaviour and ecology ==
Hornbills are diurnal, generally travelling in pairs or small family groups. Larger flocks sometimes form outside the breeding season. The largest assemblies of hornbills form at some roosting sites, where as many as 2400 individual birds may be found.

=== Diet ===
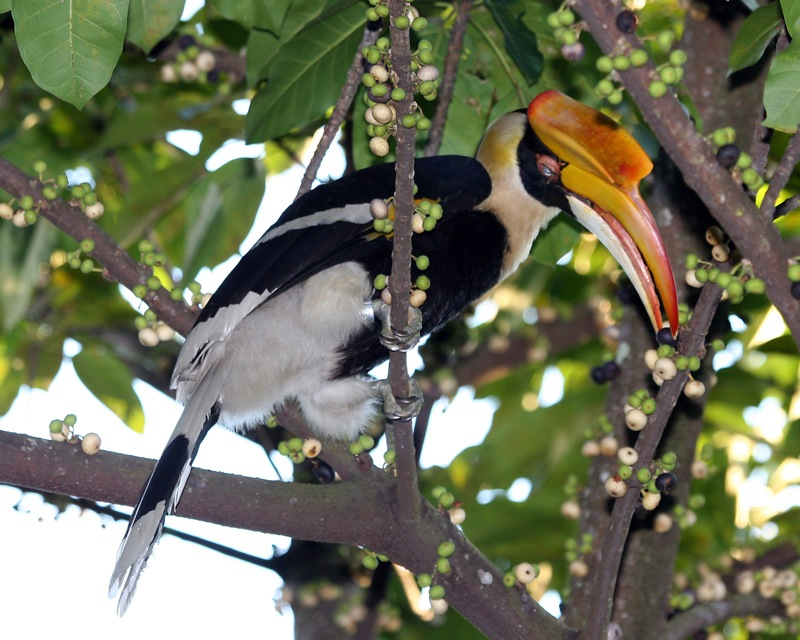
Female great hornbill feeding on figs. Fruit forms a large part of the diet of forest hornbills.

Hornbills are omnivorous birds, eating fruit, insects and small animals. They cannot swallow food caught at the tip of the beak as their tongues are too short to manipulate it, so they toss it back to the throat with a jerk of the head. While both open country and forest species are omnivorous, species that specialise in feeding on fruit are generally found in forests, while the more carnivorous species are found in open country. Forest-dwelling species of hornbills are considered to be important seed dispersers. Some hornbill species (e.g., Malabar pied-hornbill) have a great preference for the fruits of the strychnine tree (Strychnos nux-vomica), which contain the potent poison strychnine.

Some hornbills defend a fixed territory. Territoriality is related to diet; fruit sources are often patchily distributed and require long-distance travel to find. Thus, species that specialise in fruit are less territorial.

=== Breeding ===
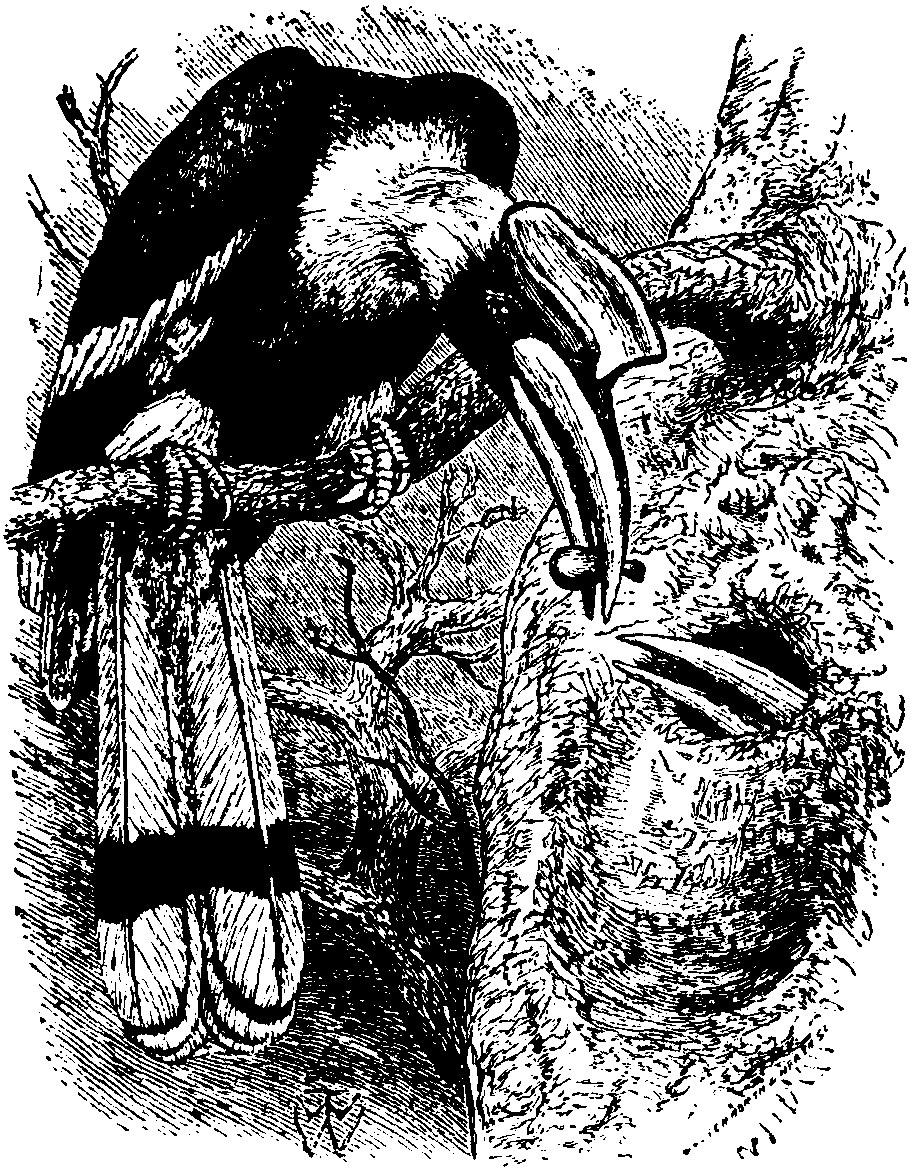
Male hornbill transfers a fig to the female.

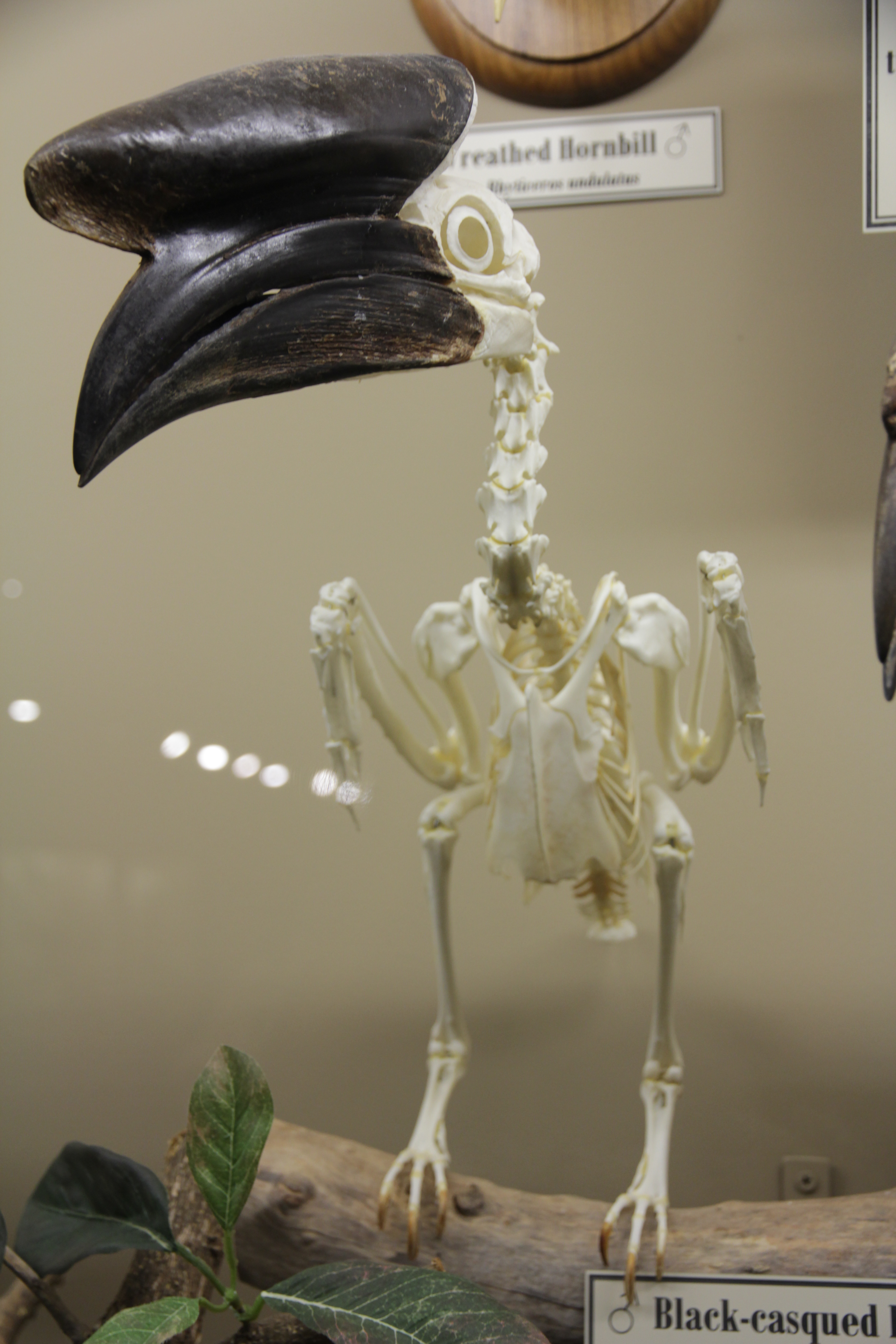
Male black-casqued hornbill (Ceratogymna atrata) on display at the Museum of Osteology.

Hornbills generally form monogamous pairs, although some species engage in cooperative breeding. The female lays up to six white eggs in existing holes or crevices, either in trees or rocks. The cavities are usually natural, but some species may nest in the abandoned nests of woodpeckers and barbets. Nesting sites may be used in consecutive breeding seasons by the same pair. Before incubation, the females of all Bucerotinae—sometimes assisted by the male—begin to close the entrance to the nest cavity with a wall made of mud, droppings and fruit pulp. When the female is ready to lay her eggs, the entrance is just large enough for her to enter the nest, and after she has done so, the remaining opening is also all but sealed shut. There is only one narrow aperture, big enough for the male to transfer food to the mother and eventually the chicks. The function of this behaviour is apparently related to protecting the nesting site from rival hornbills. The sealing can be done in just a few hours; at most it takes a few days. After the nest is sealed, the hornbill takes another five days to lay the first egg. Clutch size varies from one or two eggs in the larger species to up to eight eggs for the smaller species. During the incubation period the female undergoes a complete and simultaneous moult. It has been suggested that the darkness of the cavity triggers a hormone involved in moulting. Non-breeding females and males go through a sequential moult. When the chicks and the female are too big to fit in the nest, the mother breaks out the nest and both parents feed the chicks. In some species the mother rebuilds the wall, whereas in others the chicks rebuild the wall unaided. The ground hornbills do not adopt this behaviour, but are conventional cavity-nesters.

=== Associations with other species ===
A number of hornbills have associations with other animal species. For example, some species of hornbills in Africa have a mutualistic relationship with dwarf mongooses, foraging together and warning each other of nearby birds of prey and other predators. Other relationships are commensal, for example following monkeys or other animals and eating the insects flushed up by them.

== Taxonomy ==
The family Bucerotidae was introduced (as Buceronia) by the French polymath Constantine Samuel Rafinesque in 1815; it comes from the genus name Buceros given by Carl Linnaeus in 1758 from Ancient Greek βοῦς (boûs), meaning "ox", and κέρας (kéras), meaning "horn", and thus, "ox horn".

There are two subfamilies: the Bucorvinae contain the two ground hornbills in a single genus, and the Bucerotinae contain all other taxa. Traditionally they are included in the order Coraciiformes (which includes also kingfishers, rollers, hoopoes and bee-eaters). In the Sibley-Ahlquist taxonomy, however, hornbills are separated from the Coraciiformes into an order of their own, Bucerotiformes, with the subfamilies elevated to family level. Given that they are almost as distant from the rollers, kingfishers and allies as are the trogons, the arrangement chosen is more a matter of personal taste than any well-established taxonomic practice. All that can be said with reasonable certainty is that placing the hornbills outside the Coraciiformes and the trogons inside would be incorrect.

Genetic data suggests that ground hornbills and Bycanistes form a clade outside the rest of the hornbill lineage. They are thought to represent an early African lineage, while the rest of Bucerotiformes evolved in Asia. However, another study claims that the ground hornbills diverged first, followed by Tockus. Within Tockus, two clades have been identified based on genetics and vocal types—'whistlers' and 'cluckers'. The 'cluckers' have been placed in a separate genus, Lophoceros.

Bycanistes belongs to a clade of mostly African species that also includes Ceratogymna and Tropicranus. Another member of this clade is the Black dwarf hornbill. The Black dwarf hornbill is typically classified in the genus Tockus but in this study, is a sister species to the White-crested hornbill. If these two species are classified in congeneric, Tropicranus becomes a junior synonym of Horizocerus, as that was one of the old names used for the Black dwarf hornbill. This clade also includes one Southeast Asian species, the white-crowned hornbill.

As for the other Asian hornbill species, Buceros and Rhinoplax are each other's closest relatives, Anorrhinus is part of a clade that has Ocyceros and Anthracoceros as sister taxa, and Aceros, Rhyticeros, and Penelopides form another clade. However, according to this study, Aceros is polyphyletic; the rufous-headed hornbill, writhed hornbill, and wrinkled hornbill form a clade with the Sulawesi hornbill, and are in turn more closely related to Penelopides. These four species have been classified in a separate genus, Rhabdotorrhinus. Similarly, the knobbed hornbill is more closely related to Rhyticeros, leaving the rufous-necked hornbill the only member of the genus Aceros.

The following cladogram showing the relationships between the genera is based on a molecular phylogenetic study by Juan-Carlos Gonzalez and collaborators that was published in 2013. The number of species in each genus is taken from the taxonomy published by the AviList team.

- Bucerotidae
  - Bucorvus – ground hornbills, 2 species
  - - - Lophoceros – 8 species
      - Tockus – 10 species
    - - - - Berenicornis – white-crowned hornbill
          - Horizocerus – 4 species
        - - Ceratogymna – 2 species
          - Bycanistes – 6 species
      - - - Rhinoplax – helmeted hornbill
          - Buceros – 3 species
        - - - Anorrhinus – 3 species
            - - Ocyceros – 3 species
              - Anthracoceros – 5 species
          - - Aceros – rufous-necked hornbill
            - - Rhyticeros – 6 species
              - - Rhabdotorrhinus – 4 species
                - Penelopides – 5 species

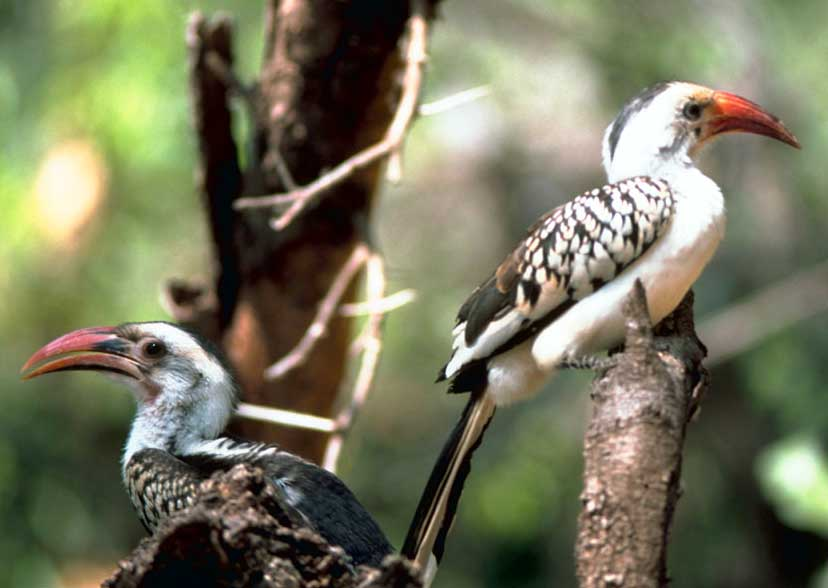
The red-billed hornbill now usually includes several species-level taxa

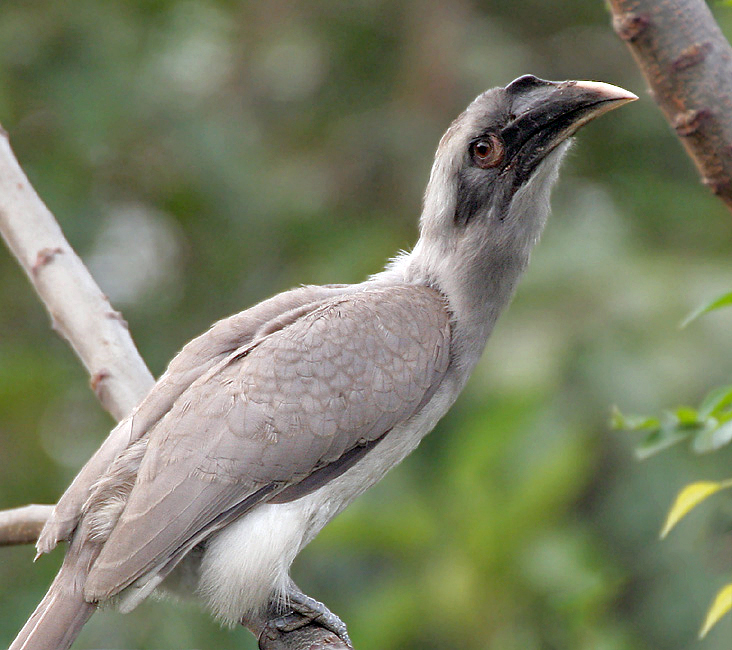
The Indian grey hornbill is an overall grey bird and native to the Indian subcontinent. So are other members of genus Ocyceros.

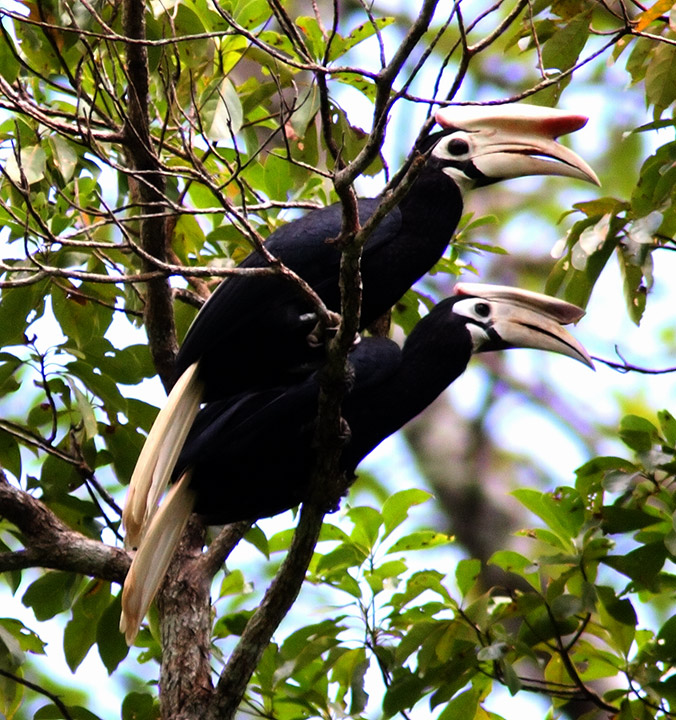
All members of Anthracoceros, like these Palawan hornbills, have a pied plumage

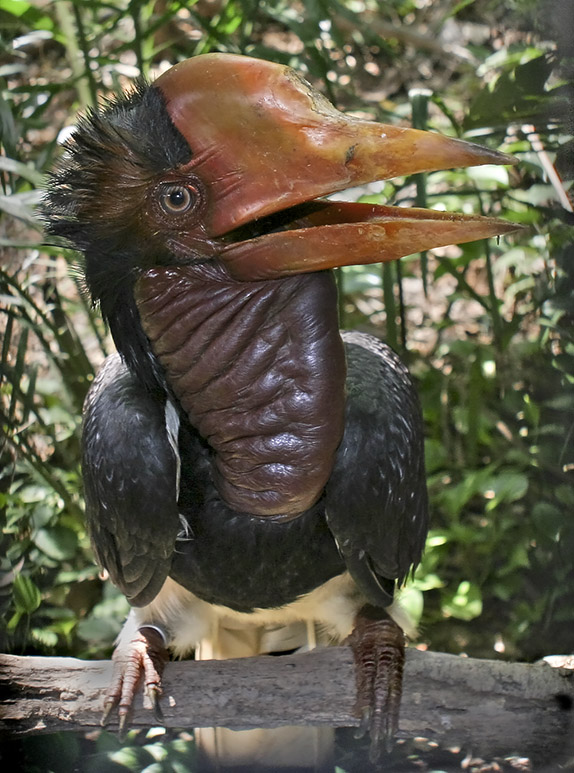
The uniquely long-tailed helmeted hornbill is commonly placed in its own genus, though some place it in Buceros

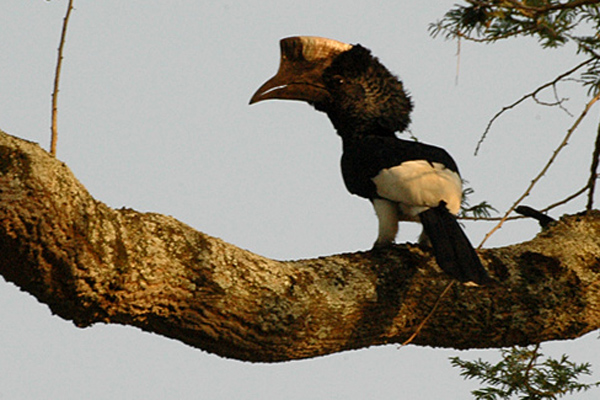
Like all Bycanistes, the black-and-white-casqued hornbill has pied plumage and a dull beak. It is found in wooded habitats in Africa.

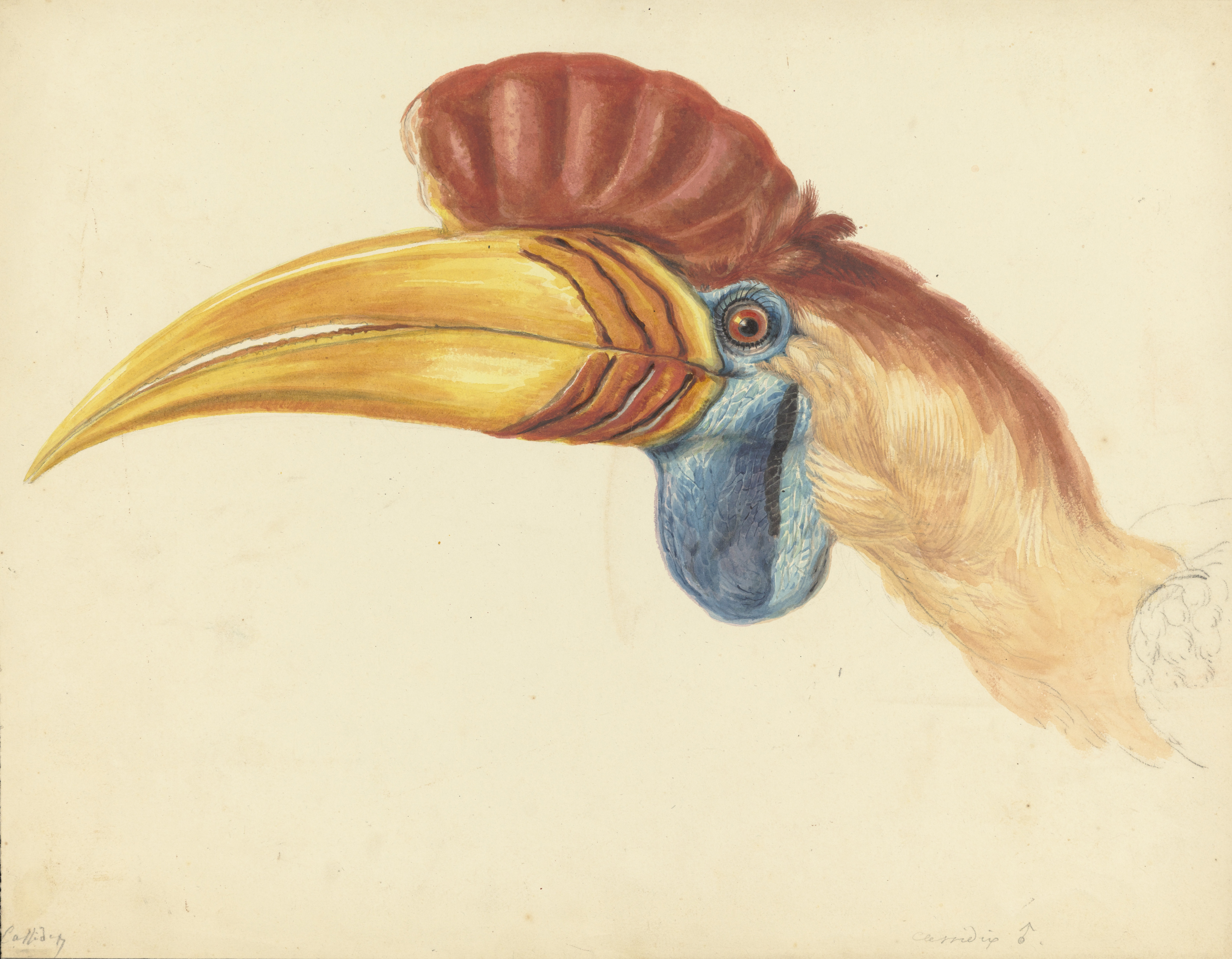
Knobbed hornbill, Aceros cassidix, early 19th century, Indonesia

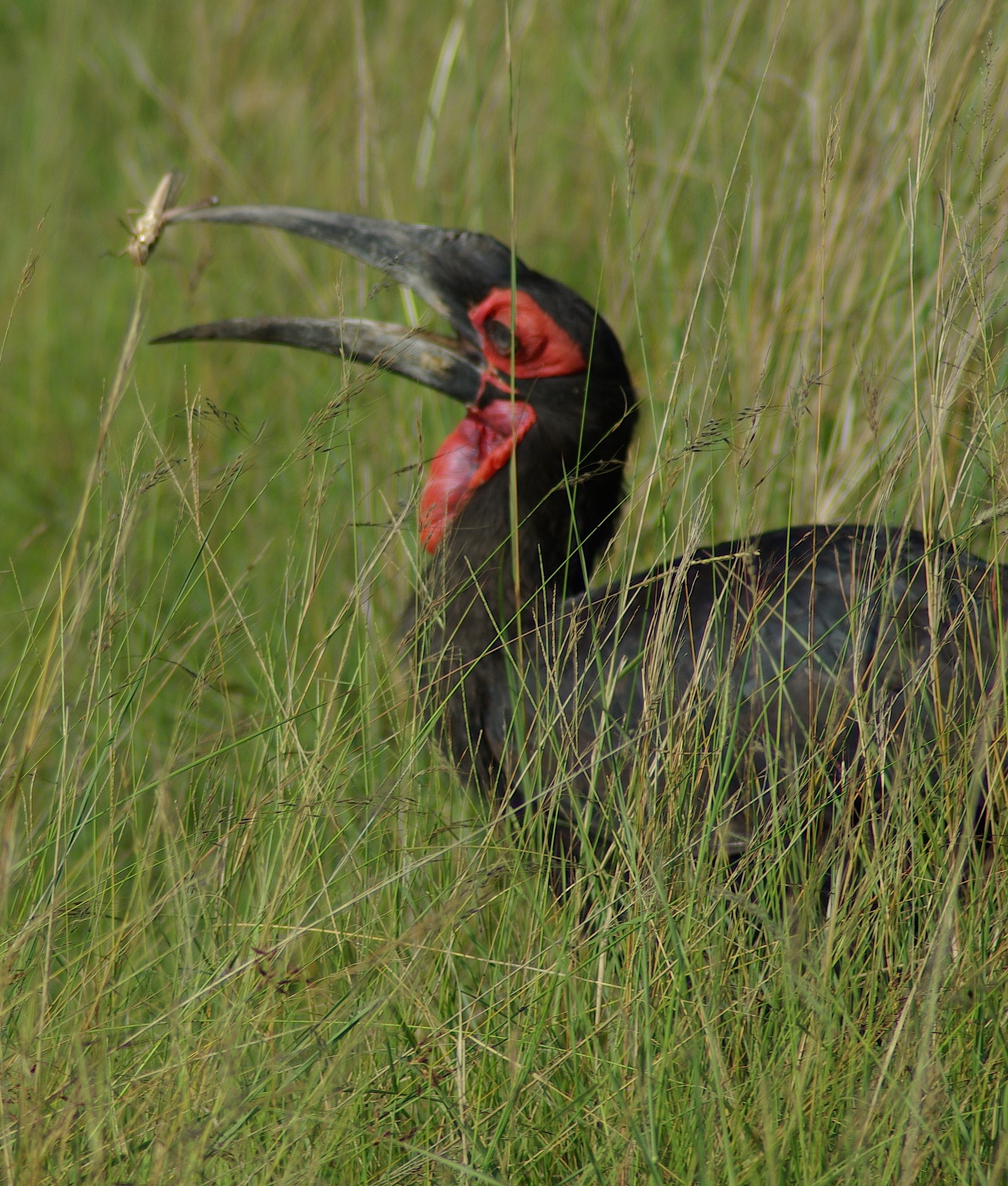
Southern ground hornbill (bluish throat indicates female) about to swallow a grasshopper

=== Fossil record ===
- Bucorvus brailloni – Late Miocene (Morocco)
- Euroceros bulgaricus – Late Miocene (Bulgaria)
- Tockus sp. – Early Miocene (Uganda)

Some scientists believe the hornbill evolutionary tree spread from the Indian microcontinent after Gondwana, before India merged with Asia.

== Relationship with humans ==
=== Cultural significance ===
Most species' casques are very light, containing much airspace. However, the helmeted hornbill has a solid casque made of a material known as hornbill ivory, which is greatly valued as a carving material in China and Japan. It was used as a medium for the art of netsuke, and also used for hunting purposes in places like India. The Iban people of Borneo regards the Rhinoceros hornbill (known as Kenyalang) as the king of the worldly birds, who acts as the intermediary between the man and the God. The Wreathed hornbill (Undan) is believed by the Iban people to be the guide of dead souls to the lower world.

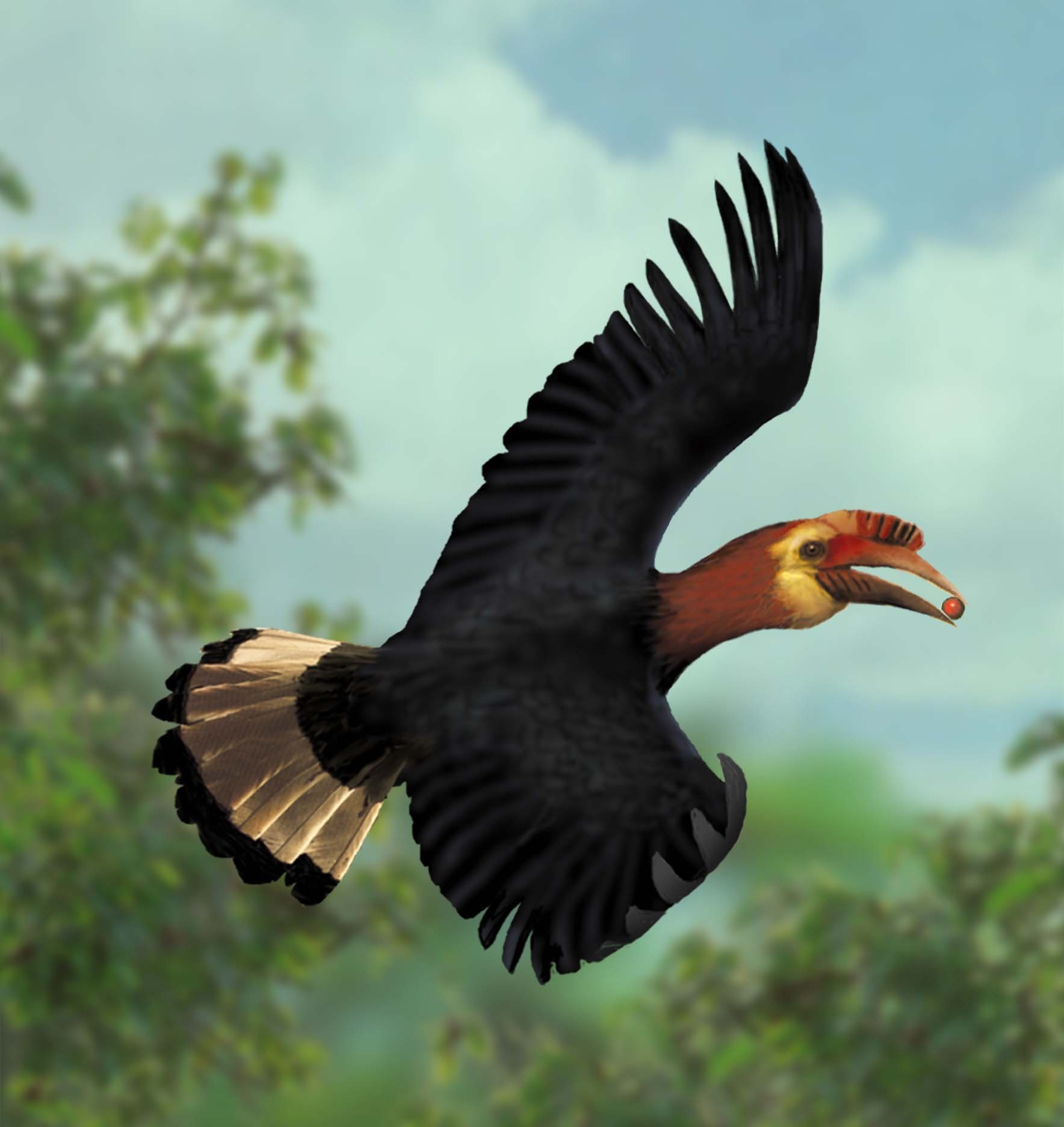
The rufous-headed hornbill, found only in two small islands in central Philippines, is among the most threatened hornbills.

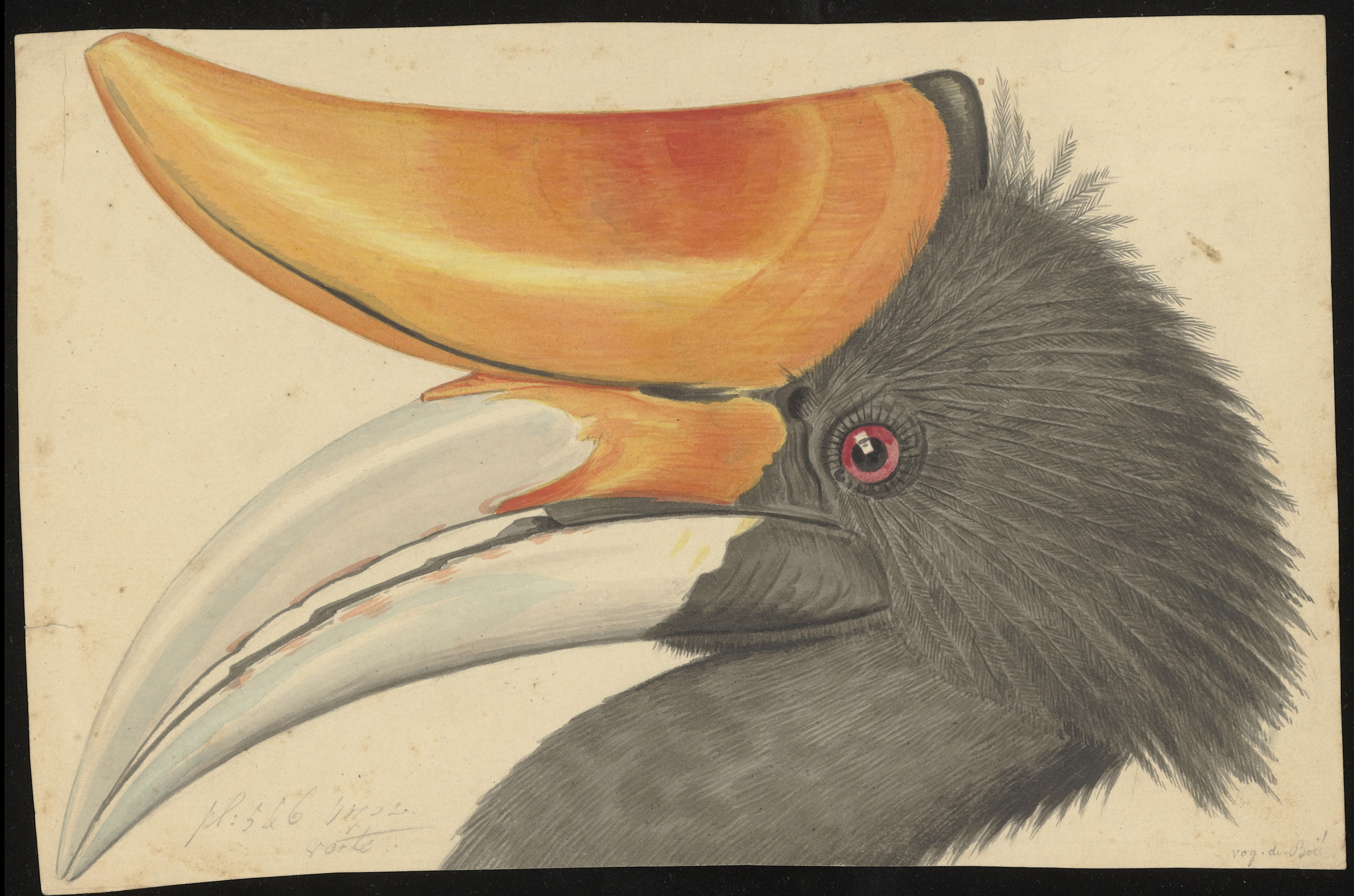
Early nineteenth century drawing of the Rhinoceros hornbill (Buceros rhinoceros), Indonesia.

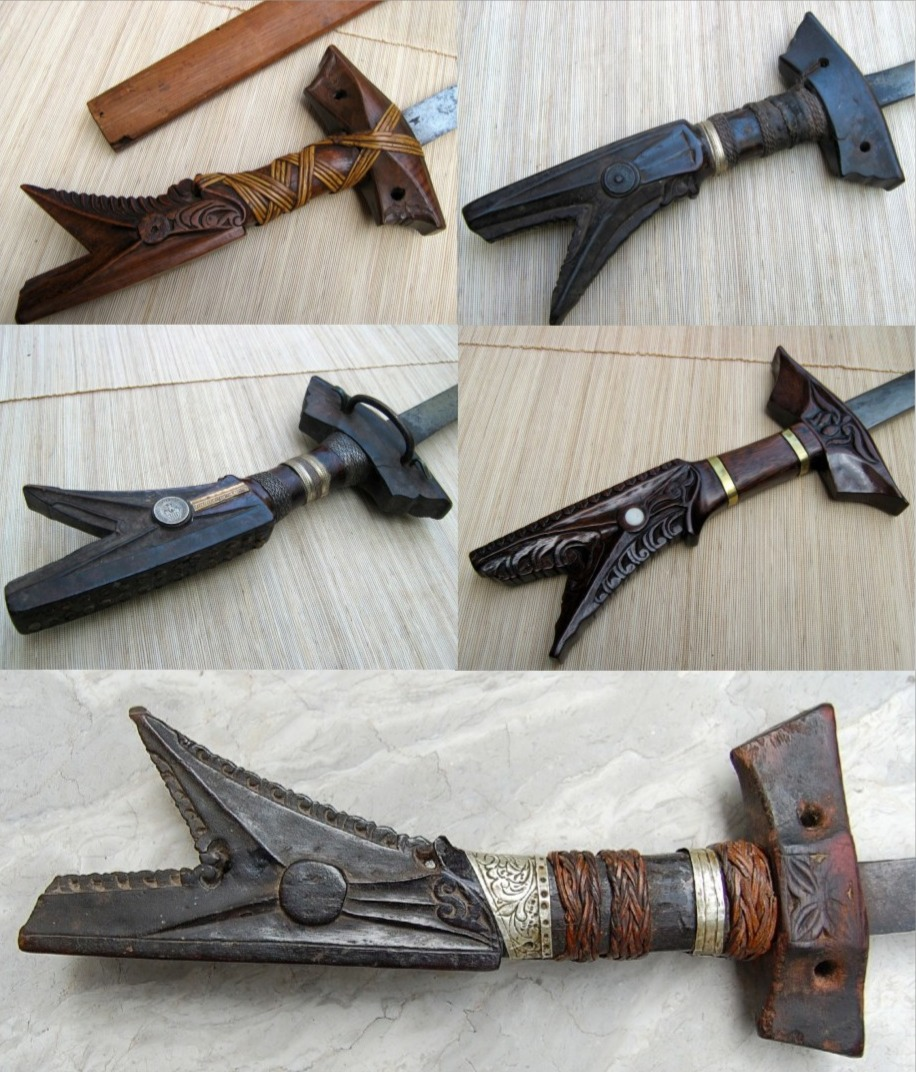
Detail of the hilts of kampílan swords from the Philippines with kalaw (hornbill) pommels

=== Status and conservation ===
None of the African species of hornbills are seriously threatened, but many Asian hornbills are threatened by hunting and habitat loss, as they tend to require primary forest. Among these threatened species, only the plain-pouched hornbill and rufous-necked hornbill are found on the Asian mainland; all others are insular in their distribution. In the Philippines alone, the Palawan hornbill is vulnerable, and the Mindoro is endangered. The Visayan hornbill is classified as endangered by the IUCN, but considered critically endangered by the National List of Threatened Terrestrial Fauna of the Philippines. A subspecies of the Visayan hornbill, the Ticao hornbill, was declared extinct in 2013. Two of the three critically endangered hornbills, the rufous-headed hornbill and the Sulu hornbill, are also restricted to the Philippines. The latter species is one of the world's rarest birds, with only 20 breeding pairs or 40 mature individuals, and faces imminent extinction. The other critically endangered species, the helmeted hornbill, is threatened by uncontrolled hunting and the trade in hornbill ivory.

=== In popular culture ===
A hornbill named Zazu is the king's adviser and one of the characters in The Lion King franchise, voiced by Rowan Atkinson in the original 1994 version and John Oliver in the remade 2019 version.

A hornbill was used as the official mascot of one of Malaysia's political parties, the Democratic Action Party.

The rhinoceros hornbill is the official state animal of Sarawak, a Malaysian state located in Borneo.

The great hornbill, a member of the hornbill family, is the official state bird of Kerala, an Indian state. The species is rated vulnerable.

The Hornbill Festival is an annual cultural festival celebrated every December in Nagaland, a state in Northeast India, where the hornbill is present in the folklore of most ethnic groups of the region.
