= Rebberg =

Rebberg may refer to:

- Rebberg (Mulhouse), a mountain and suburb of Mulhouse in France
- Rebberg (Gundelfingen), a hill in Gundelfingen in Southern Germany

== See also ==
- Rehberg (disambiguation)
