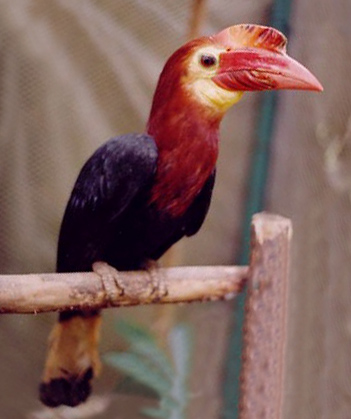
- Male

Conservation status
- Endangered (IUCN 3.1)

Scientific classification
- Kingdom: Animalia
- Phylum: Chordata
- Class: Aves
- Order: Bucerotiformes
- Family: Bucerotidae
- Genus: Rhabdotorrhinus
- Species: R. waldeni

Binomial name
- Rhabdotorrhinus waldeni (Sharpe, 1877)

Synonyms
- Aceros leucocephalus waldeni Aceros waldeni

= Walden's hornbill =

Species of bird

Walden's hornbill (Rhabdotorrhinus waldeni), locally called dulungan or talarak, also known as the Visayan wrinkled hornbill, rufous-headed hornbill or writhe-billed hornbill, is an endangered species of hornbill living in the rainforests on the islands of Negros and Panay in the Philippines. It is closely related to the writhed hornbill, but can be recognized by the yellow throat and ocular skin in the male, and the blue throat and ocular skin in the female (both throat and ocular skin are deep orange or red in both sexes of the writhed hornbill). Its binomial name commemorates the Scottish ornithologist Viscount Walden.

It is considered one of the Western Visayas Big 5, which includes the Negros bleeding-heart pigeon, Visayan spotted deer, Visayan hornbill and the Visayan warty pig.

== Description and taxonomy ==
EBird describes the bird as "A large rare bird of lowland and foothill forest on Panay and Negros, although almost extinct on the latter. Mostly black with a cream-colored tail with black terminal band, an orange casque, and a wrinkled lower bill. Male has a rufous head, a yellow pouch, and yellow around the eye. Female has a black neck and head, a smaller bill and casque, and blue and yellow around the eye and on the chin. The only other hornbill in range is the Visayan hornbill but the Writhe-billed is larger, with a pale bill. Voice includes a three-noted throaty chuckle."

They exhibit sexual dimorphism with the males having a rufous head and yellow facial skin while the females having a black head and blue facial skin and a smaller bill.

Formerly considered conspecific with the Writhed hornbill but has clear differences in voice and plummage. Male Walden's hornbills are rufous red in comparison to the cream colored Writhed males. Walden's females have blue facial skin in comparison to the red of Writhed. This species is believed to form a closely related species group with the Wrinkled hornbill, Writhed hornbill and Knobbed hornbill.

This species is monotypic.

== Habitat ==
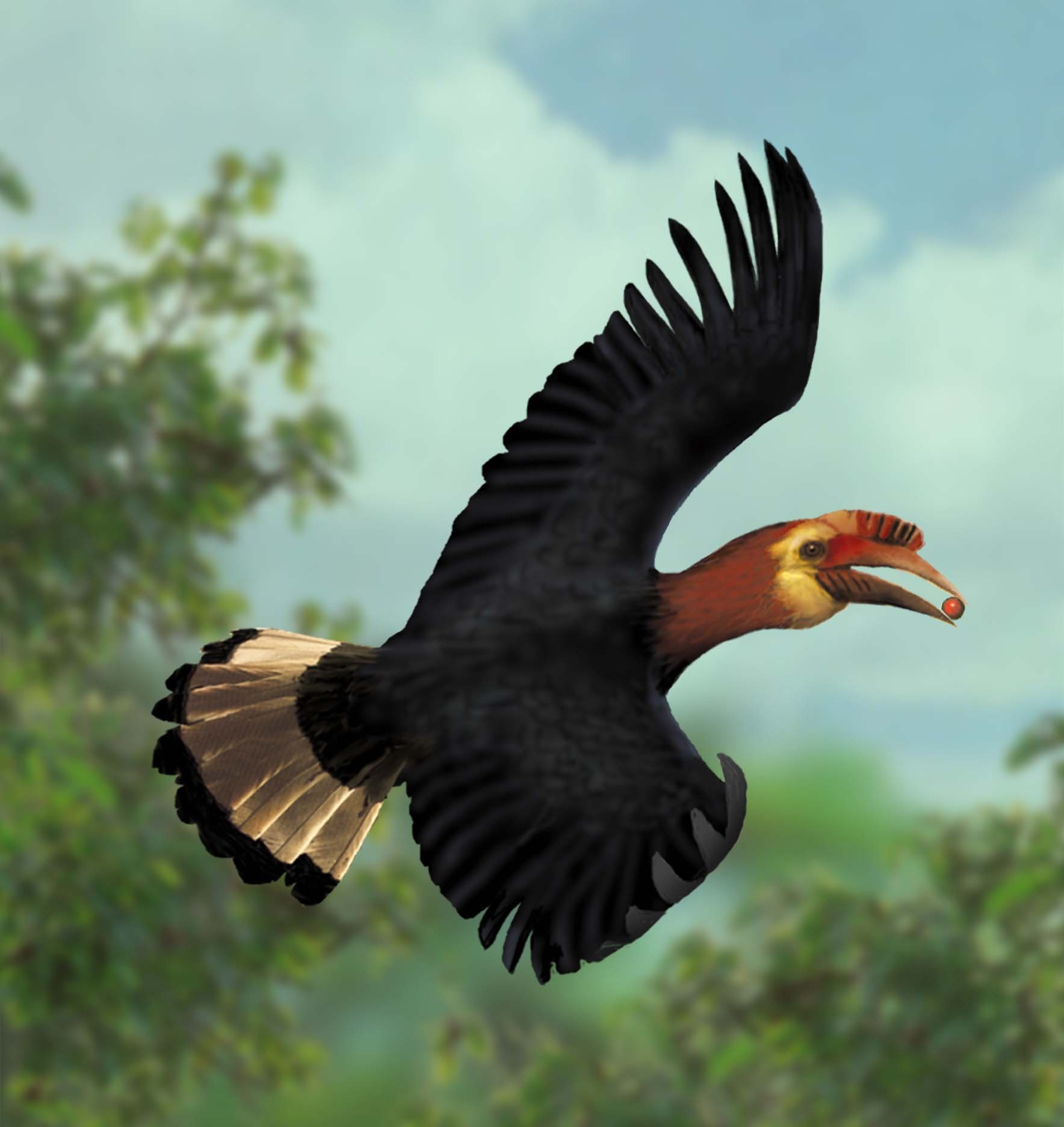
Male carrying a small fruit. As most other hornbills, this species is primarily a frugivore.

It inhabits closed-canopy forests, also frequenting logged areas and occasionally isolated trees in clearings at an altitudinal range of 400 to 1,200 m (1,300 to 3,900 ft) in Panay and 350 to 950 m (1,150 to 3,120 ft) in Negros. It prefers areas abundant fruit-bearing trees for feeding and large trees for nesting. They are known to live in small and noisy flocks. The Walden's hornbills are cavity nesters and use natural or carved-out hollows in tree trunks for its nest. As other hornbills, they reproduce very slowly. As lack of appropriate nesting sites is a problem, nest boxes are being attached to tree trunks in certain reserves.

== Ecology and behavior ==
Diet

They are primarily frugivorous eating figs and berries but they are also known to eat insects, lizards and other small animals. Usually encountered in small flocks but larger flocks of 25 to 30 birds have been sighted. It may make local nomadic movements in response to food availability.

Breeding

All hornbills are monogamous and mate for life.They are cavity nesters and rely on large dipterocarp trees for breeding. The female seals itself within the tree cavity and the male is in charge of gathering food for its mate and chicks. The male stores food in a gular pouch and regurgitates it to feed its mate and chicks. Cooperative breeding wherein immature birds from previous seasons help out in feeding the female and chick have not been observed with this species so far. Among Philippine hornbills, it has only been recorded with the Rufous hornbill.

Based on interviews with poachers, nests in May to July. Nests in large dipterocarp trees such as Shorea polysperma. Clutch size is typically 2 eggs but cases of 3 eggs documented.

== Conservation status ==
In 2025, this species was downlisted to endangered from critically endangered. The IUCN Red List estimates the population to be 1,000 to 3,000 mature individuals with the population continuing to decline. This species is particularly at risk as a large majority of the population is found in the Central Panay Mountain Range which is an unprotected area. It is presumed extinct on Guimaras and now survives only on Negros and Panay, No recent figures are available for Negros, where it may be functionally extinct.

The species population estimate is based on a 2007 study by the Philinthat supposedly found nest 1,018 nests by Philippine Initiative for Conservation of Environment through their nest protection program. Due to this high poaching rate, Philincon has devised a nest guarding program where they pay locals US$20 a month to guard hornbill nests and offer an incentive of US$11 for each successful fledge. This program was effective cutting down the poaching rate to just 5% but has since ceased. It is unknown if these numbers remain the same as poaching appears to have increased considerably and poached birds have been detected outside the Philippines in Indonesia and the Hungary indicating that this species is now traded internationally Local organizations such as Haribon Foundation and Philippines Biodiversity Conservation Foundation were opposed to the downlisting due to increased poaching, not being in a protected area and if original estimates from 2007 were correct and not double counted.

Walden's hornbill reproduce very slowly and thus are unable to survive high hunting pressures coupled with heavy logging of the rainforests. By 2007, Negros and Panay had a 3% and 6% remaining forest cover with most of this being higher elevation forest where this bird does not thrive in. Despite already paltry forest cover, deforestation still continues thanks to both legal and illegal logging, conversion into farmland, mining and road development. As for the case of the Northwest Panay Peninsula Natural Park, a road was built splitting it from the Central Panay Mountain Range and has severely affected the population in the former as these roads allow for easier access by hunters and loggers.

Another huge threat is hunting and capture for the illegal wildlife trade. According to the Philippine Initiative for Environmental Conservation (Philincon), up to 50% of all nests in Central Panay Mountain Range were affected by poachers who would either climb up or cut down the nesting trees to poach the nestlings and the mother.

The bird is listed as an EDGE species by the Zoological Society of London where it is ranked as the 50th which uses the basis of evolutionary distinctness and endangeredness.

This bird was bred in captivity for the first time by the Mari-it Wildlife and Conservation Park in 2005. As of 2010, they have bred 15 Walden's hornbills. In 2019, Talarak Foundation has also successfully bred them in captivity in their Negros facility after nine years of attempts.

Further conservation actions proposed are: more funding should be allocated primarily to in situ protection along the lines of PhilCon's guarding scheme; conduct further surveys, particularly on Panay to identify important sites and use this data to decide further actions; continue community awareness programmes to reduce hunting and illegal logging on both Negros and Panay; work in partnership at the government level to strengthen protected area legislation and improve the network in the long term; and support the development of captive breeding and reintroduction programmes.
