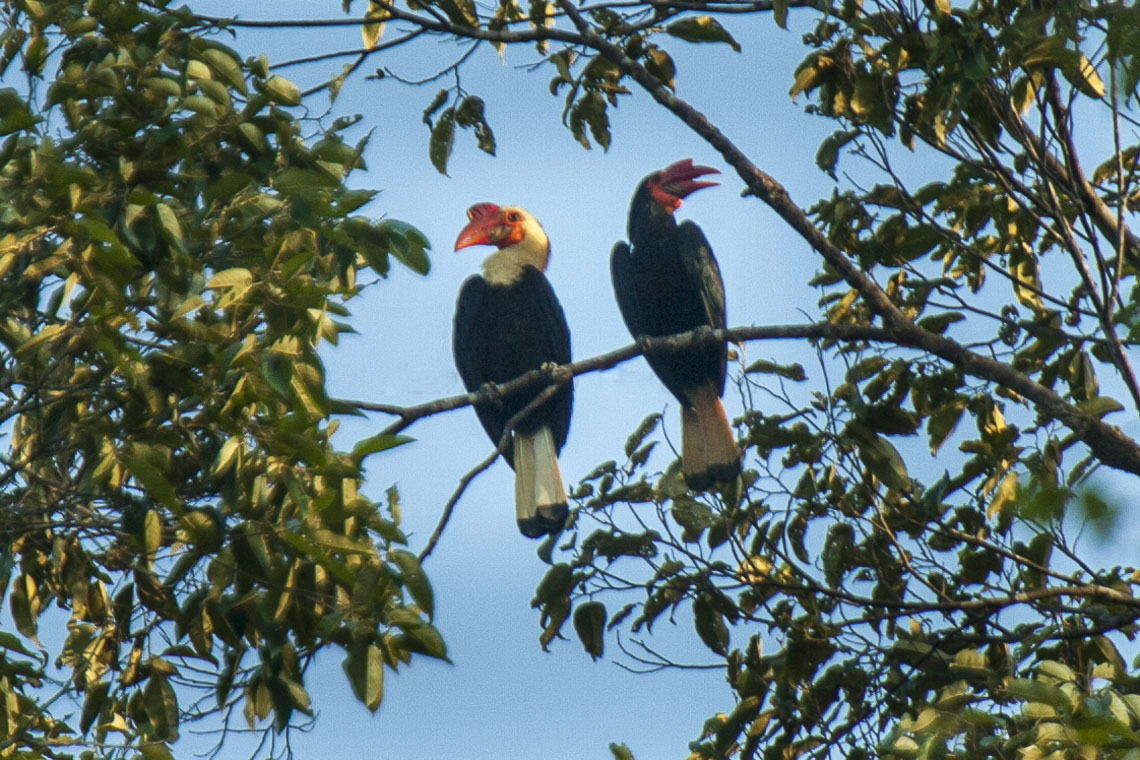
- Male (left) and female (right)

Conservation status
- Near Threatened (IUCN 3.1)

Scientific classification
- Kingdom: Animalia
- Phylum: Chordata
- Class: Aves
- Order: Bucerotiformes
- Family: Bucerotidae
- Genus: Rhabdotorrhinus
- Species: R. leucocephalus

Binomial name
- Rhabdotorrhinus leucocephalus (Vieillot, 1816)

Synonyms
- Aceros leucocephalus

= Writhed hornbill =

Species of bird

The writhed hornbill (Rhabdotorrhinus leucocephalus), also known as the Mindanao wrinkled hornbill, is a species of hornbill in the family Bucerotidae. It is endemic to primarily lowland forests on the Philippine islands of Mindanao, Dinagat and Camiguin Sur. It formerly included the Walden's hornbill as a subspecies, but unlike that species, both sexes of the writhed hornbill have orange-red throat and peri-ocular skin. The writhed hornbill is threatened by habitat loss and hunting.

== Description ==
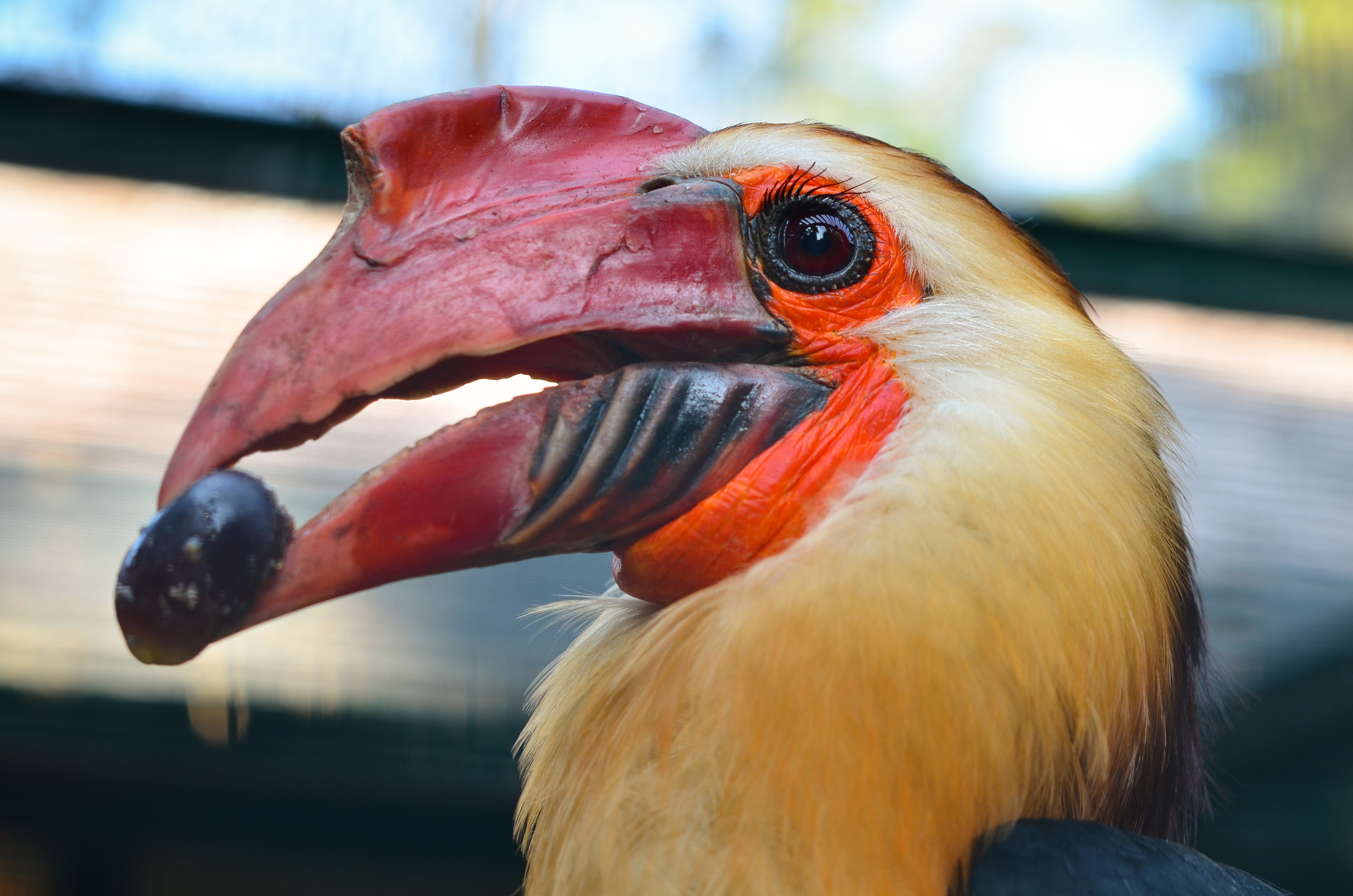
A captive male

== Ecology and behavior ==
Diet is mainly fruit but also feeds on insects, small mammals and reptiles. Forages in across large areas usually with Southern rufous hornbill. Flocks as large as 37 birds have been recorded.

All hornbills are monogamous and mate for life.They are cavity nesters and rely on large dipterocarp trees for breeding. The female seals itself within the tree cavity and the male is in charge of gathering food for its mate and chicks. The male stores food in a gular pouch and regurgitates it to feed its mate and chicks. Cooperative breeding wherein immature birds from previous seasons help out in feeding the female and chick have not been observed with this species so far. Among Philippine hornbills, it has only been recorded with the Rufous hornbill.

Species specific information on its breeding habits are limited. Nest has been recorded in March but fledged young also recorded as early as January. Lays 2 eggs in captivity and the entire nesting cycle including incubation and fledging took 92 days.

== Habitat and conservation status ==
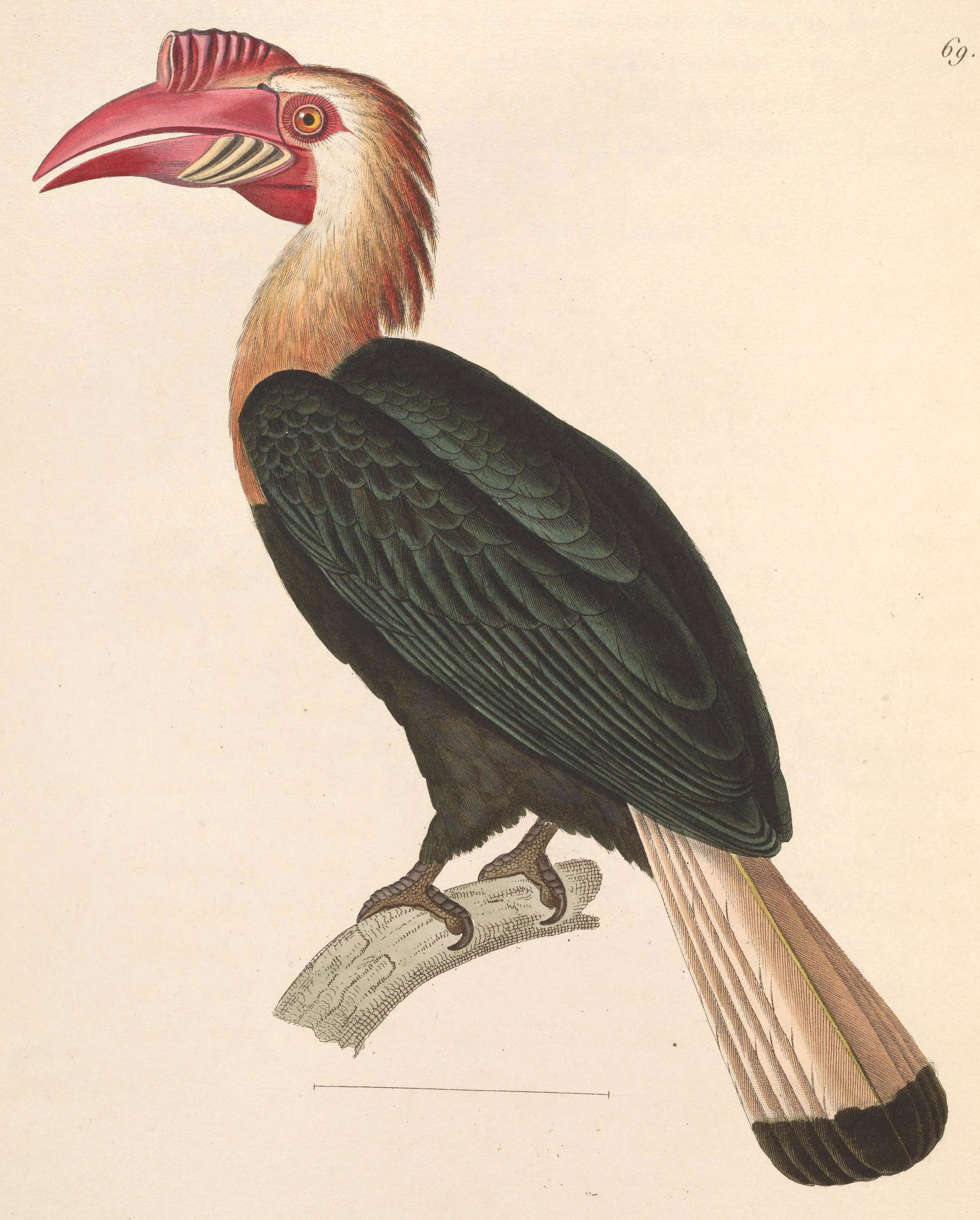
An illustration of a male

It is found in tropical moist lowland forest up to 1,000 meters above sea level but more common below 500 meters.

IUCN has assessed this bird as near-threatened species with the population continuing to decline. While there are no official population estimates, it is believed that population does not exceed 10,000 individuals. This species' main threat is habitat loss with wholesale clearance of forest habitats as a result of logging, agricultural conversion and mining activities occurring within the range, it is also hunted for food and for the illegal pet trade.

Occurs in a few protected areas like Mount Apo, Pasonanca Natural Park, Mount Timolan Protected Landscape and Mount Kitanglad but actual protection and enforcement from illegal logging and hunting are lax.
