= Renberg =

Renberg is a Nordic surname. Notable people with the surname include:

- Elsa Laula Renberg (1877–1931), Sami activist and politician
- Mikael Renberg (born 1972), Swedish ice hockey player
- Tore Renberg (born 1972), Norwegian writer

== See also ==
- Rehberg (surname)
