= Mari-it Wildlife and Conservation Park =

Protected area in the Philippines

- Location within Visayas Location within Philippines
- Location: Lambunao, Iloilo, Philippines
- Coordinates: 11°6′8.59″N 122°24′38.98″E
- Area: 1,000 hectares (2,500 acres)
- Established: 1993
- Visitors: 100 monthly (in 2019)
- Governing body: West Visayas State University–College of Agriculture and Forestry

The Mari-it Wildlife and Conservation Park is a protected area in Lambunao, Iloilo, in the island of Panay in the Philippines. It is managed by the West Visayas State University–College of Agriculture and Forestry (WVSU-CAF). It was also the largest hornbill breeding facility in the world.

== Etymology ==
The conservation park, is named after mariit, an indigenous belief in Western Visayas with roots from animism. Essentially mariit is a belief that every facet of nature is inhabited by the taglugar which serves as a motive for locals to respect and take care of nature.

== History ==
The Department of Environment and Natural Resources (DENR) of the Philippine national government and the Mulhouse Zoo of France set up the Mari-it Wildlife and Conservation Park in 1993, initially as part of conversation efforts for the Visayan spotted deer. The facility expanded its scope to also include other endemic Visayan species.

The protected area was placed under the management of the West Visayas State University–College of Agriculture and Forestry (WVSU–CAF)

In 1995, efforts on breeding Visayan Writhed billed hornbill in the facility began. The first successful breeding, the first in the world for this species, was accomplished in January 2005.

The conservation park began to experience shortage of funding in 2014. Since then, the park relied on funding from the Lambunao municipal government to develop the park's facilities. It was also opened to the public in June 2019 as part of efforts to secure additional revenue for the park.

== Species ==
The Mari-it Wildlife and Conservation Park was established primarily to conserve the Visayan spotted deer, which was designated as the "flagship species" for Panay island's biodiversity conservation. In 2005, it was reportedly the largest hornbill breeding facility in the world and houses the critically endangered Visayan Writhed billed hornbill and Panay Tarictic hornbill. It also hosts

In 2019, the species the conservation park hosts include: 16 Visayan writhed hornbills, undetermined number of Visayan tarictic hornbills; 20 endangered Visayan spotted deer; 11 Visayan warty pigs; five Visayan leopard cats and two cloud rats.
