= Keranggas =

- Location within Borneo
- Coordinates: 1.56667°N 111.8°E
- Country: Malaysia
- State: Sarawak
- Elevation: 512 m (1,680 ft)

Keranggas (also known as Kranggas) is a settlement and Iban longhouse in Sarawak, Malaysia. It lies approximately 163.2 kilometres (101 mi) east of the state capital Kuching.

The village is establishing electricity generation using micro hydroelectric weirs (low dams) to give a continuous supply.

In 2010, during the Gawai Dayak festivities, the village was visited by a wrinkled hornbill (Aceros corrugatus), an unusual occurrence.

Neighbouring settlements include:

- Menjuau 1.9 kilometres (1.2 mi) east
- Seladong 2.6 kilometres (1.6 mi) southeast
- Bair 5.9 kilometres (3.7 mi) west
- Batikal 5.9 kilometres (3.7 mi) west
- Begantong 6.7 kilometres (4.2 mi) southeast
- Jambu 7.4 kilometres (4.6 mi) west
- Janting 7.4 kilometres (4.6 mi) north
