= Rehberg =

Rehberg may refer to:

== Places ==
- Rehberg, a neighborhood of Krems an der Donau, Lower Austria
- Rehberg, part of the Spantekow municipality in Vorpommern-Greifswald, Germany
- Rehberg (Harz), the 4th highest mountain in Lower Saxony, Germany
- Rehberg (Wasgau), the highest hill on German soil in the Franco-German Wasgau uplands
- German name of Liberk
- German name of Srní (Klatovy District)

== Other uses ==
- Rehberg (surname)
