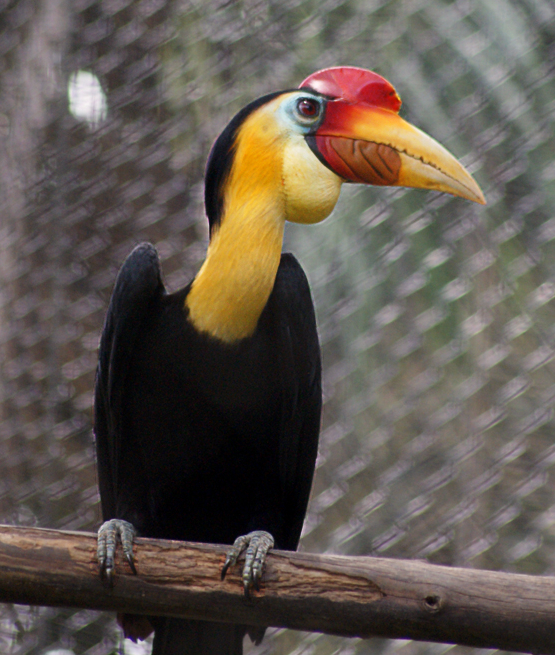
- Wrinkled hornbill (Rhabdotorrhinus corrugatus)

Scientific classification
- Kingdom: Animalia
- Phylum: Chordata
- Class: Aves
- Order: Bucerotiformes
- Family: Bucerotidae
- Genus: Rhabdotorrhinus; AB Meyer & Wiglesworth, 1898

Species
- See text.

= Rhabdotorrhinus =

Genus of birds

Rhabdotorrhinus is a genus of birds in the hornbill family, Bucerotidae.

== Species ==
The genus contains the following four species:

Genus Rhabdotorrhinus – AB Meyer & Wiglesworth, 1898 – four species
Common name	Scientific name and subspecies	Range	Size and ecology	IUCN status and estimated population
Walden's hornbill	Rhabdotorrhinus waldeni (Sharpe, 1877)	Philippines	Size: Habitat: Diet:	CR
Writhed hornbill Male Female	Rhabdotorrhinus leucocephalus (Vieillot, 1816)	the Philippine islands of Mindanao, Dinagat and Camiguin Sur	Size: Habitat: Diet:	NT
Sulawesi hornbill Male Female	Rhabdotorrhinus exarhatus (Temminck, 1823) Two subspecies: R. e. exarhatus; R. e. sanfordi	Sulawesi	Size: Habitat: Diet:	VU
Wrinkled hornbill	Rhabdotorrhinus corrugatus (Temminck, 1832) Two subspecies: R. c. corrugatus; R. c. rugosus	Thai-Malay Peninsula, Sumatra and Borneo	Size: Habitat: Diet:	EN
