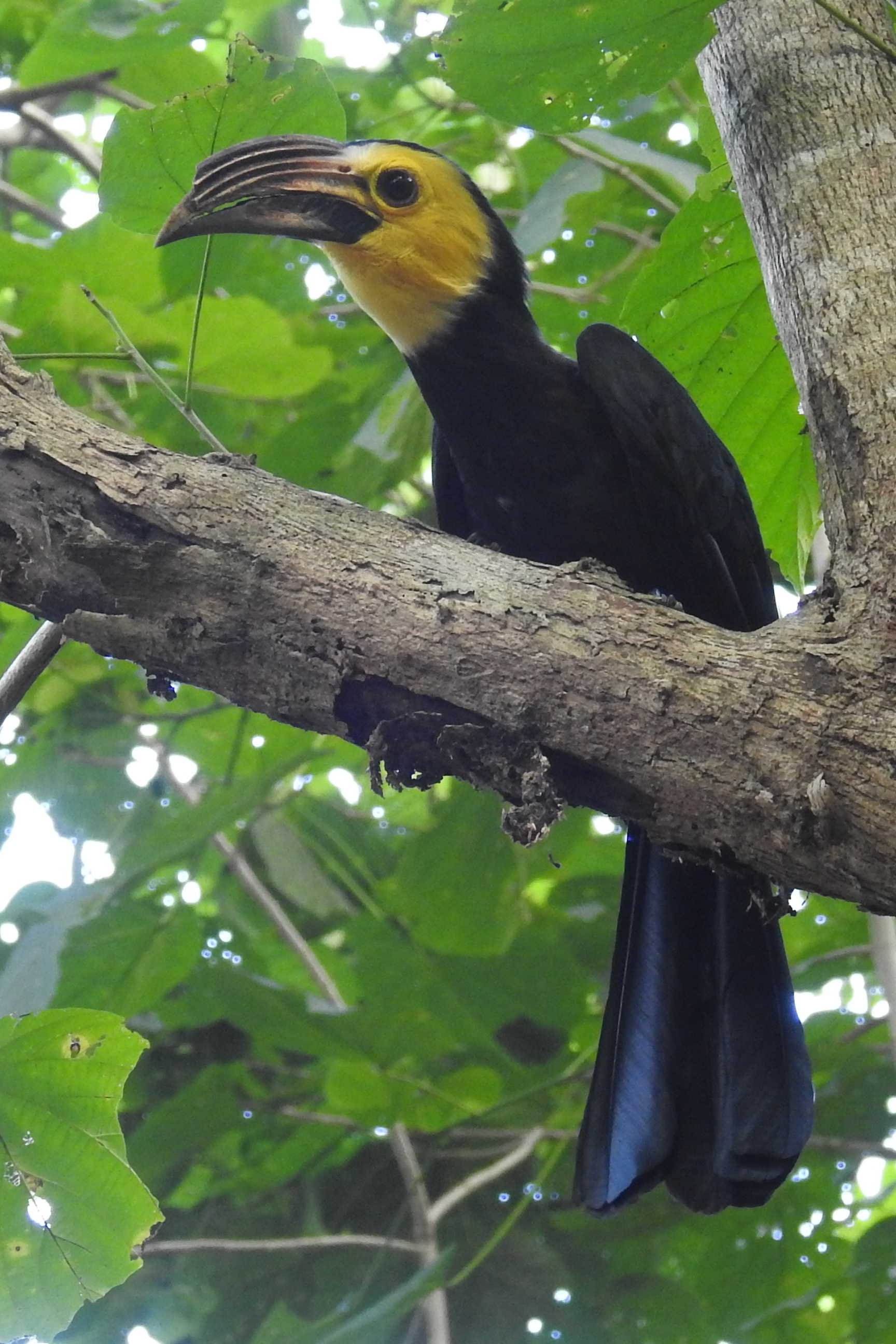
- Male
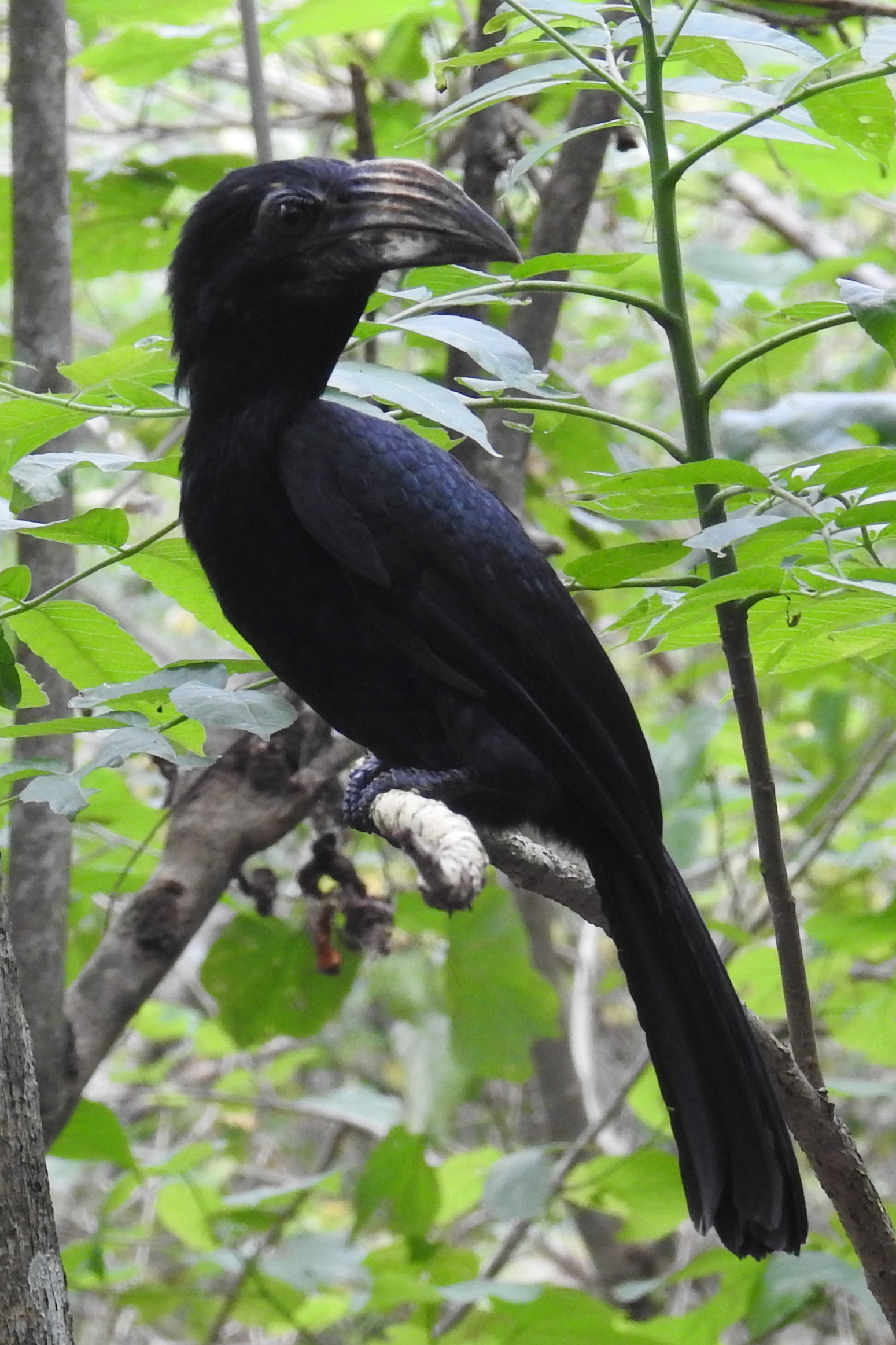
- Female

Conservation status
- Vulnerable (IUCN 3.1)

Scientific classification
- Kingdom: Animalia
- Phylum: Chordata
- Class: Aves
- Order: Bucerotiformes
- Family: Bucerotidae
- Genus: Rhabdotorrhinus
- Species: R. exarhatus

Binomial name
- Rhabdotorrhinus exarhatus (Temminck, 1823)

Synonyms
- Penelopides exarhatus

= Sulawesi hornbill =

Species of bird

The Sulawesi hornbill (Rhabdotorrhinus exarhatus), also known as the Sulawesi tarictic hornbill, Temminck's hornbill or Sulawesi dwarf hornbill, is a relatively small, approximately 45 cm (18 in) long, black hornbill. The male has a yellow face and throat, and yellowish horn bill with black markings. The female has all-black plumage and a darker bill.

== Taxonomy ==
An Indonesian endemic, the Sulawesi hornbill is distributed in the tropical lowland, swamps and primary forests of Sulawesi and nearby islands, from sea level to altitude up to 1,100 metres. There are two subspecies of the Sulawesi hornbill. The nominate subspecies, P. e. exarhatus, occurs in north Sulawesi, and P. e. sanfordi is found in central, east and south Sulawesi, Buton and Muna Island.

== Status and conservation ==
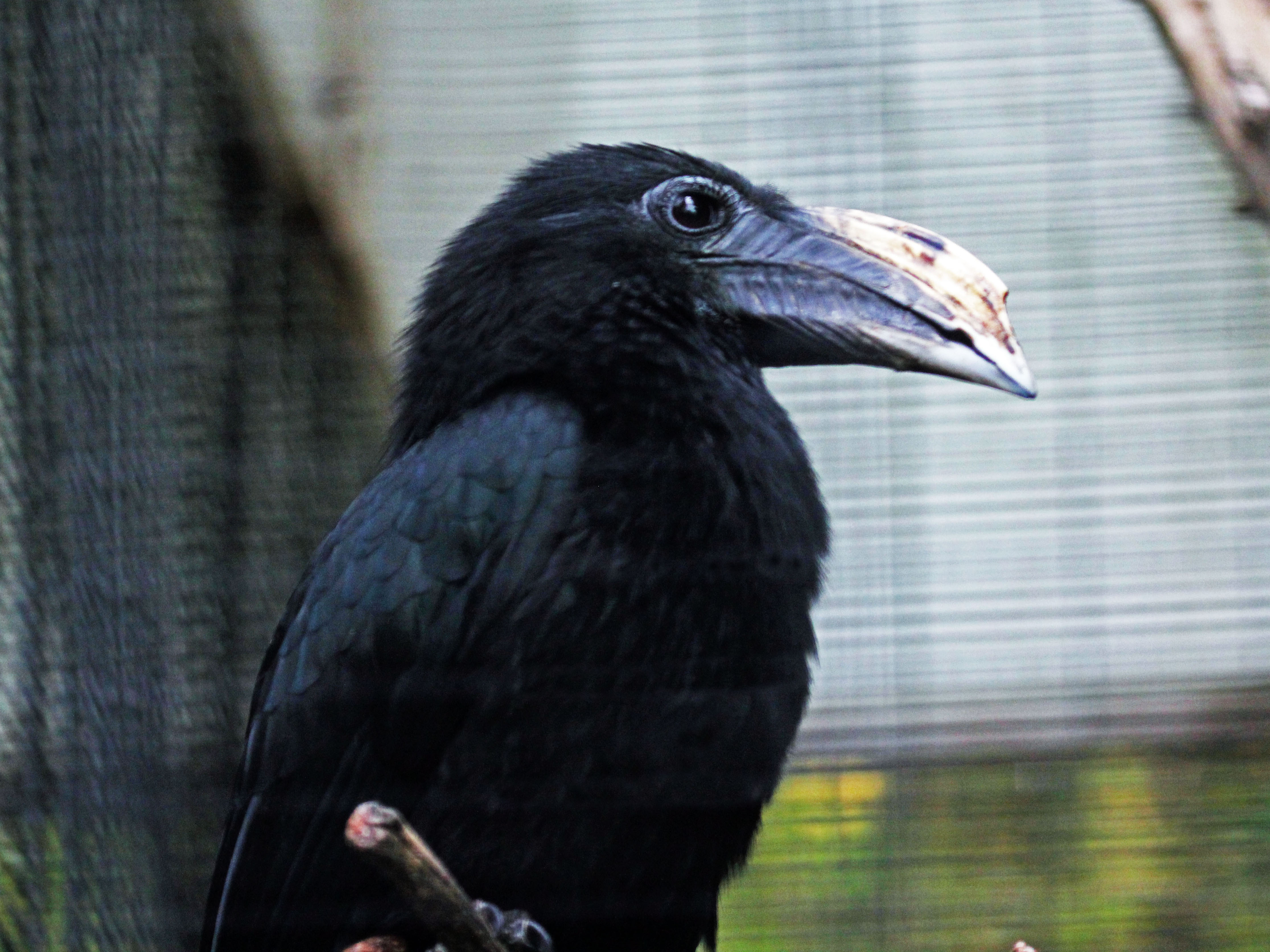
Female at San Diego Zoo

Uncommon throughout its native range, the Sulawesi hornbill is evaluated as vulnerable on the IUCN Red List of Threatened Species. The species usually performs better in captivity than other species of hornbill. It is kept in multiple facilities across Europe, North America & Asia, including but not limited to Weltvogelpark Walsrode in Germany, Plzeň Zoo in the Czech Republic as well as San Diego Zoo, Bronx Zoo, ZooTampa at Lowry Park and Turtle Back Zoo in the United States. At Walsrode the birds are kept in the bird garden area, whilst at San Diego they have two pairs, one in the walk-through Parker Aviary and the other in a small nearby aviary.

== Behavior ==
The Sulawesi hornbill is a social species that lives in groups of up to 20 individuals. It is believed that only the dominant pair breeds, while the remaining members of the group act as helpers. The diet consists mainly of fruits, figs and insects. The female seals herself inside a tree hole to lay her eggs. During this time, the male and helpers provide food for the female and the young.

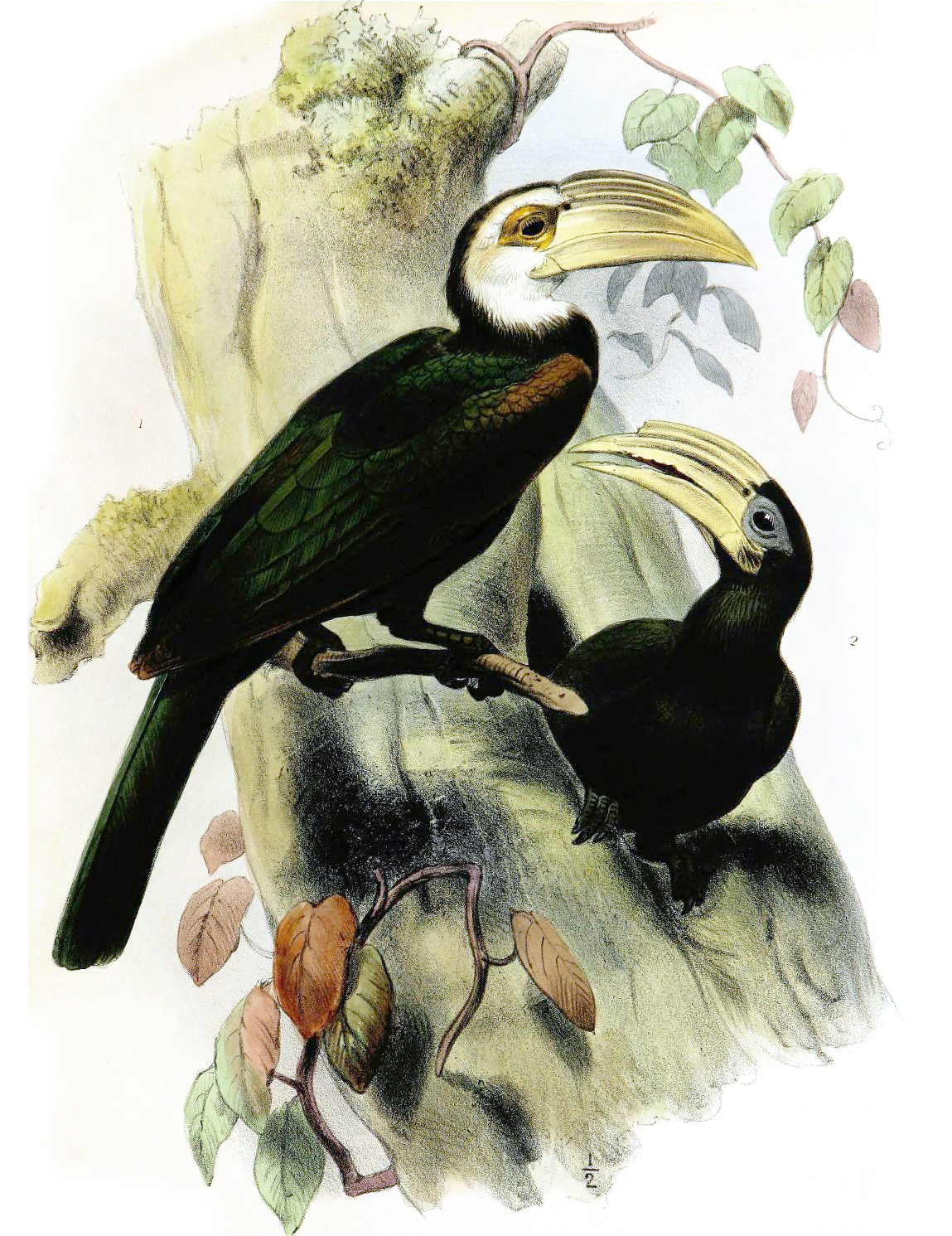
Male (left) and female
