= Batikal =

- Location within Borneo
- Coordinates: 1.55°N 111.75°E
- Country: Malaysia
- State: Sarawak
- Elevation: 520 m (1,710 ft)

Batikal is a settlement in Sarawak, Malaysia. It lies approximately 157.6 kilometres (98 mi) east of the state capital Kuching.

Neighbouring settlements include:

- Jambu 2.6 kilometres (1.6 mi) northwest
- Bair 3.7 kilometres (2.3 mi) north
- Keranggas 5.9 kilometres (3.7 mi) east
- Lempong 6.7 kilometres (4.2 mi) southwest
- Seladong 7.4 kilometres (4.6 mi) east
- Menjuau 7.6 kilometres (4.7 mi) east
- Kerapa 7.6 kilometres (4.7 mi) west
