= Friedrich Rehberg =

German painter

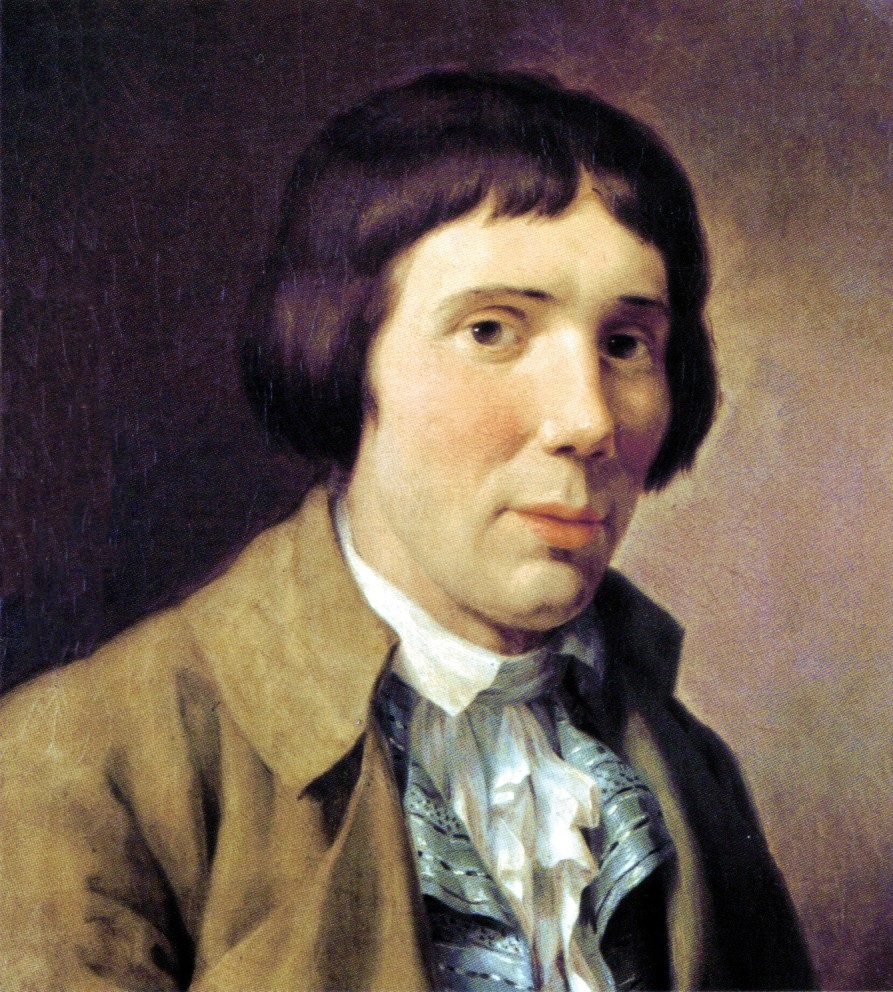
Portrait of Karl Philipp Moritz (1790)

Friedrich Rehberg (22 October 1758 – 20 August 1835) was a German portrait and historical painter.

== Life and work ==
Rehberg was born into a middle-class protestant family in Hanover in 1758, the son of a secretary for the estates of Calenberg (one of the duchies of Hannover). His elder brother, August Wilhelm Rehberg (1757–1836), became a notable politician, philosopher and writer. Friedrich, himself, studied first with Oeser in Leipzig, then with Giovanni Battista Casanova and Johann Eleazar Zeissig, in Dresden. In 1777, he went to Rome, where he studied the Old Masters, such as Caracci, Domenichino and Michelangelo, under Anton Raphael Mengs. Here he became a close friend of fellow-painter David.

In 1783 he returned to Hanover, where his reputation was now well-established, and received many commissions to paint portraits, including those of the Duke Wilhelm and the Bishop of Osnabrück. In 1784 he became drawing master at the Philanthropinum, a progressive school in Dessau where he taught art to the crown prince, Frederick. In 1786, he was made a fellow at the Prussian Academy of Arts in Berlin, becoming professor in 1787. He then returned to Rome to manage the satellite Prussian art academy which was to be built there. For political reasons, this project never materialised but Rehberg remained in the city. There he painted "Belisarius", "Oedipus and Antigone", "The Death of Abel", "Bacchus", "Orpheus and Eurydice" and "Jupiter and Venus".

In 1791 he went to Naples and made a series of drawings of Lady Hamilton posing as classical statuary, which were published in book form in 1794. In 1813 he went to London, and, in 1814, painted an allegory of Napoleon's fall. In the same year he returned for a time to Rome, but eventually settled at Munich, where he published, in 1824, "Raffael Sanzio von Urbino": the Elements of Lithographic Drawing" ("Anfangs gründe des Steinzeichners'), with thirteen of his own lithographs.

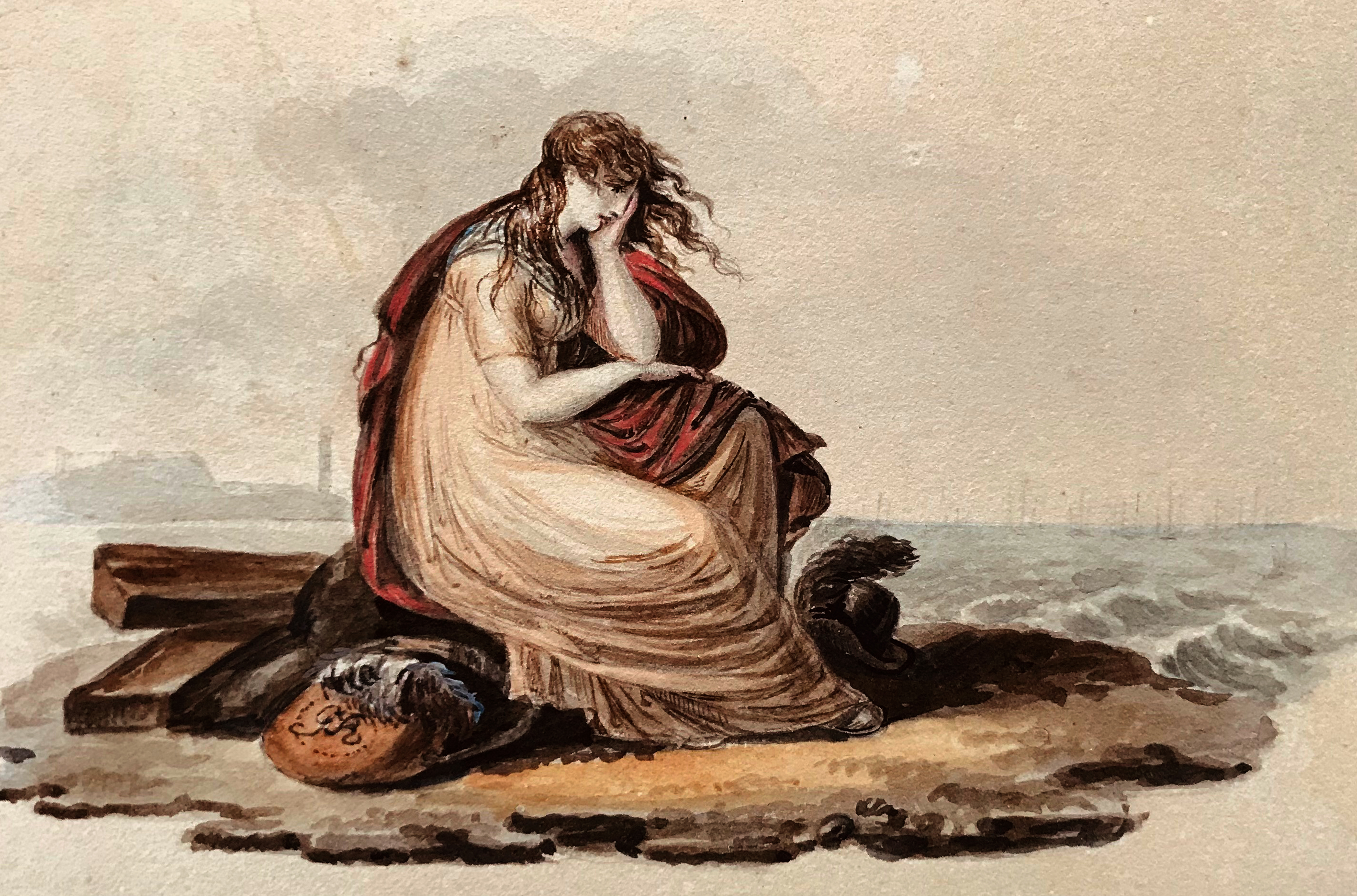
Friedrich Rehberg, Too late to see him, watercolour, signed with monogramm FR, circa 1805

Rehberg died in Munich on 20 August 1835.
