= Rehberg (surname) =

Rehberg (German pronunciation: [ˈʁeːˌbɛʁk]) is a German surname. Notable people with the surname include:

- August Wilhelm Rehberg (1757-1836), German philosopher
- Denny Rehberg (born 1955), American politician
- Eckhardt Rehberg (born 1954), German politician
- Friedrich Rehberg (1758–1835), German painter
- Gretchen Rehberg, American bishop of the Episcopal Church
- Hans-Michael Rehberg, (1938–2017), German actor
- Peter Rehberg (1968–2021), British musician
- Scott Rehberg (born 1973), American football player
- Walter Rehberg (1900–1957), Swiss concert pianist, composer and writer
