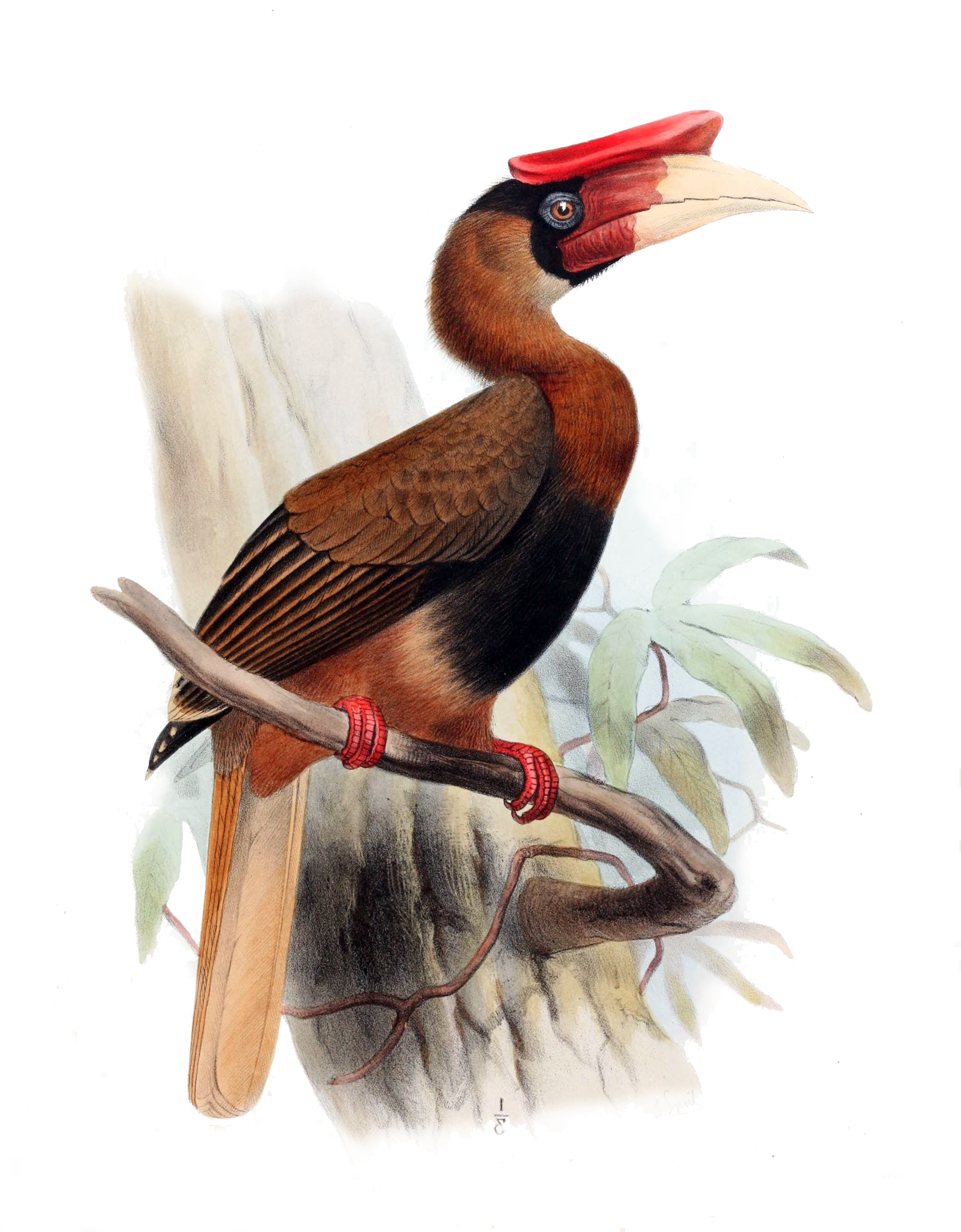

Conservation status
- Vulnerable (IUCN 3.1)

Scientific classification
- Kingdom: Animalia
- Phylum: Chordata
- Class: Aves
- Order: Bucerotiformes
- Family: Bucerotidae
- Genus: Buceros
- Species: B. mindanensis

Binomial name
- Buceros mindanensis Tweeddale, 1877

= Southern rufous hornbill =

Southern rufous Hornbill

Species of hornbill

The southern rufous hornbill (Buceros mindanensis), is a large species of hornbill endemic to the Philippines. It inhabits Mindanao, Dinagat, Siargao, Balut, Bucas, Talikud and Basilan islands of the Philippines. It prefers rainforest habitats and eats fruits, small animals, insects, and seeds. It is threatened by hunting, illegal pet trade, and use of biological resources in their habitat which all leads to their population declining.

== Biology ==
The southern rufous hornbill was formerly a subspecies of the rufous hornbill. The outer half of the southern rufous hornbill's bill is marked with a pale yellow. The species measures approximately 60–65 cm (24–26 in). Males weigh around 1,345–1,612 g (47.4–56.9 oz) and females around 1,413–1,662 g (49.8–58.6 oz).
