= Menjuau =

- Location within Borneo
- Coordinates: 1.56667°N 111.81667°E
- Country: Malaysia
- State: Sarawak
- Elevation: 532 m (1,745 ft)

Menjuau is a settlement in Sarawak, Malaysia. It lies approximately 165 kilometres (103 mi) east of the state capital Kuching.

Neighbouring settlements include:

- Keranggas 1.9 kilometres (1.2 mi) west
- Seladong 1.9 kilometres (1.2 mi) south
- Begantong 5.2 kilometres (3.2 mi) southeast
- Bair 7.6 kilometres (4.7 mi) west
- Batikal 7.6 kilometres (4.7 mi) west
- Itam 7.6 kilometres (4.7 mi) north
- Janting 7.6 kilometres (4.7 mi) north
