= Johann Eleazar Zeissig =

German painter

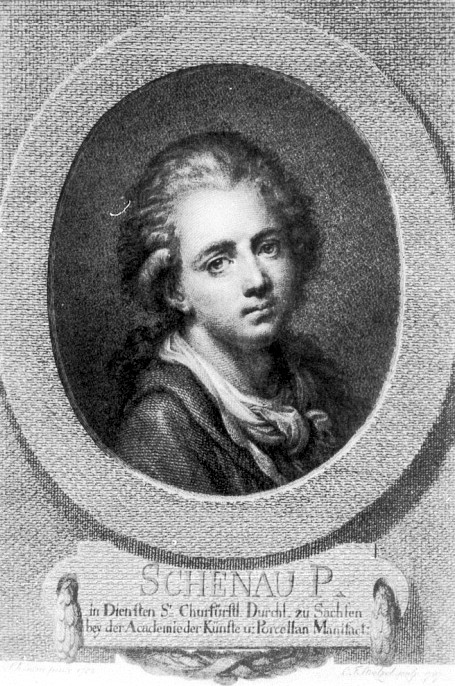
Portrait of Schenau by Christian Friedrich Stölzel (1787)

Johann Eleazar Zeissig, also known as Schenau (7 November 1737 – 23 August 1806), was a German genre, portrait and porcelain painter, and engraver; director of the Royal Academy of Arts in Dresden.

== Life ==
Schenau was born in 1737, the son of Elias Zeissig and Anna Elisabeth (née Paul), poor Damask weavers, of Großschönau, near Zittau in Saxony. Together with his five sisters, he was tutored by his father in arithmetic, writing, reading and also learnt the trade of Damask weaving. He showed an early talent for painting and drawing, and was sent away at the age of twelve to study art in Dresden, where he was also employed as a lawyer's clerk. Through the help of a pupil of Anton Raphael Mengs, he was accepted at the Dresden art school.

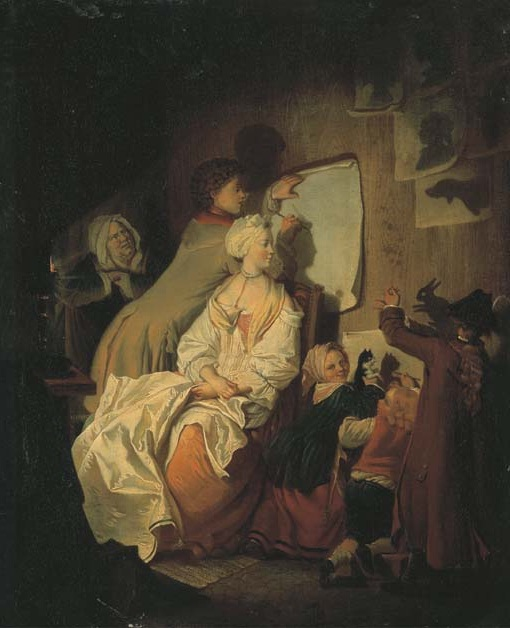
The origin of painting: A family making "chinese shadows"

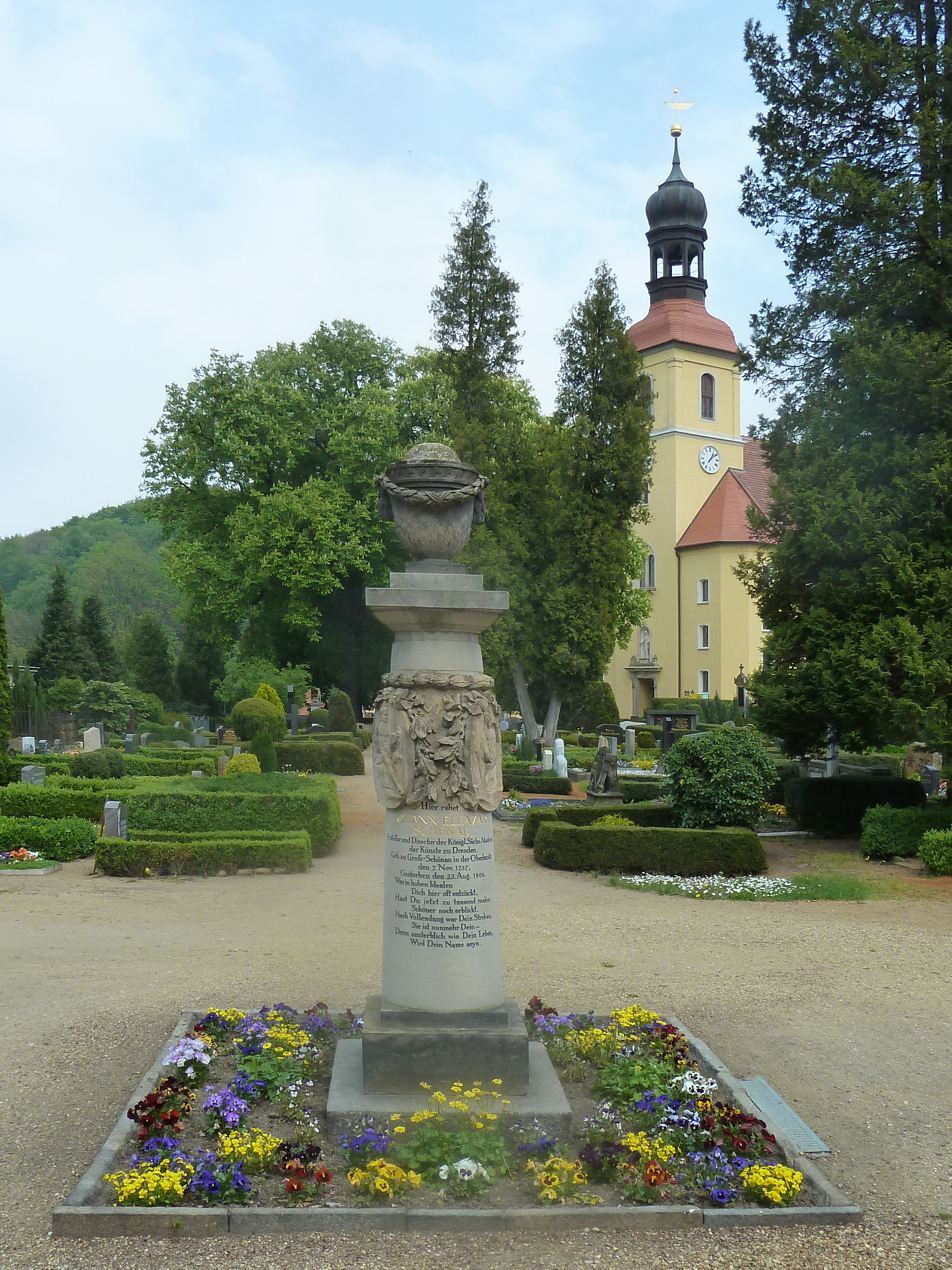
Schenau's grave in Großschönau

Here, Schenau was taught by Charles-François de Silvestre, the son of the director of the school, Louis de Silvestre. In 1756, after the outbreak of the Seven Years' War, he accompanied the Sylvestre brothers to Paris, where he stayed until 1770, working at the Royal Academy of Painting and Sculpture with, amongst others, Johann Georg Wille. He became acquainted with leading French artists of the day, such as François Boucher, Gabriel François Doyen, Maurice Quentin de La Tour and Edmé Bouchardon; he was particularly influenced by the work of Jean-Baptiste Greuze. Schenau copied the works of the old masters such as Antonio da Correggio, Guido Reni and Titian, and acquired the patronage of the Saxon ambassador, General Fontenay. He also became a china painter, working at the porcelain factory in Sèvres, taking on, in addition, the roles of goldsmith, engraver and sculptor.

Through the influence of his mentor, Charles-François de Silvestre, or his wife, the teacher and confidante of the Dauphine Maria Josepha, Schenau was introduced to the French court; he received many commissions from the Crown Princess of France and was soon the most respected genre painter in Paris. He painted portraits of, amongst others, Maria Josepha and Madame de Pompadour.

In 1770, at the end of the Seven Years' War, Schenau went back to Dresden. In that year he became a member of the Dresden Academy of Fine Arts and, three years later, the Director of the drawing school of the porcelain factory in Meissen. In Meissen, he taught students not only drawing on china, but also created new designs.

In 1774, he became professor of genre and portrait painting at the Dresden Art Academy. After the death of Charles François Hutin, in 1776, he was made, together with Giovanni Battista Casanova, alternate director of the academy and on Casanova's death in 1795, the sole director. Among his students were Christian Henry Becke, Friedrich Rehberg and Christian Leberecht Vogel; amongst his admirers was the writer August Gottlieb Meissner, who dedicated his book Alcibiades (1781) to the artist. In 1796 Schenau returned from the Meissen porcelain factory and devoted the following years to teaching at the Art Academy.

Schenau died in 1806 in Dresden. His grave was originally located in St. John's churchyard (Johanniskirchhof) but, during the secularization of the cemetery, was moved 1854 to the cemetery in Großschönau.

== Artistic style ==
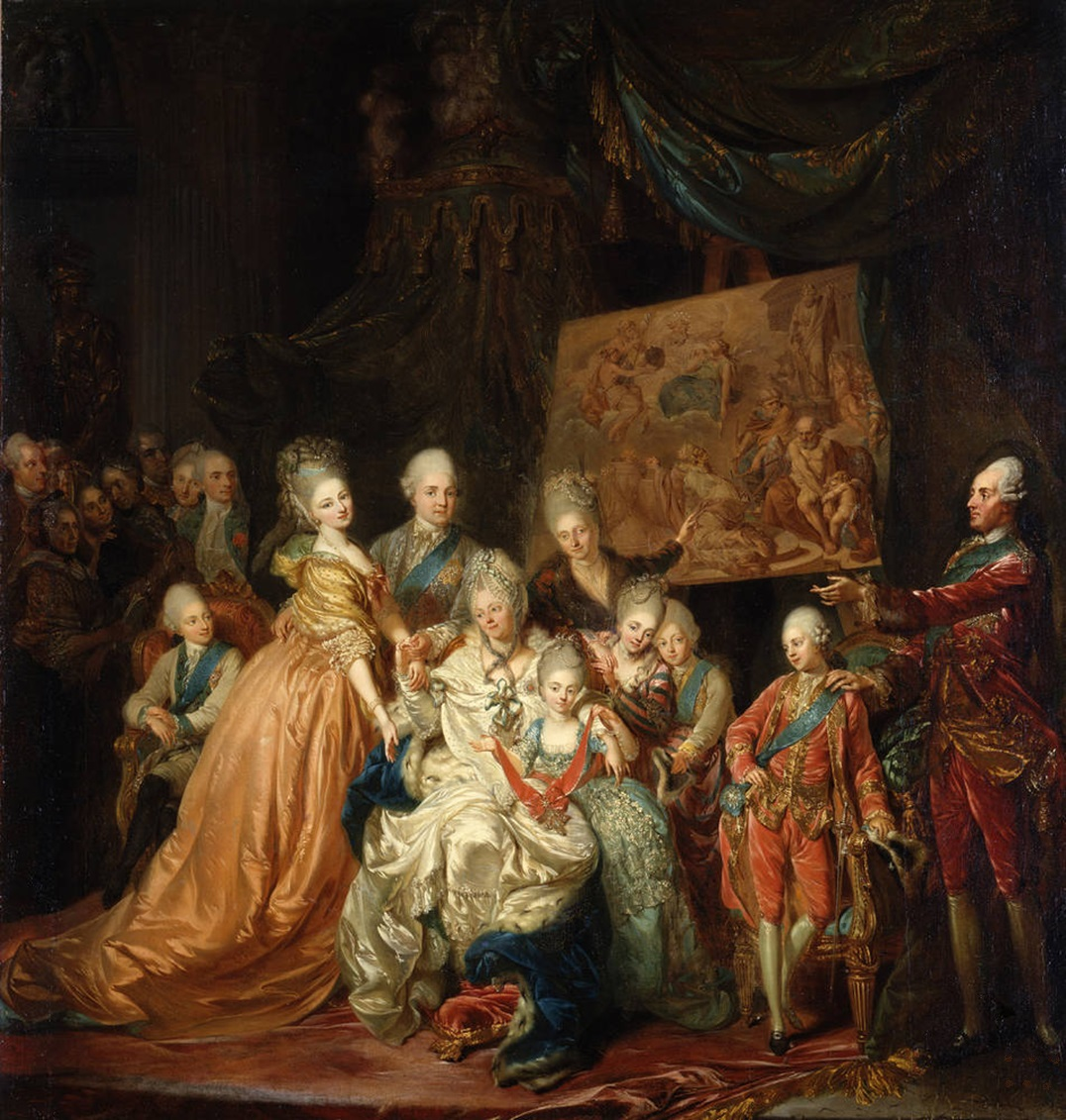
The kurfürstlich-sächsische family (1772)

Schenau began his artistic career as a copyist of old masters. In Paris he became acquainted with contemporary painters, but also through his studies at the Académie royale was influenced by French art theory of the time. His work also reveals the influence of the Dutch Fijnschilders, such as Gerard Dou and Caspar Netscher.

His work was also influenced by his French friends, such as Jean Siméon Chardin, and, especially, Jean-Baptiste Greuze. Many of his drawings and paintings were reproduced as copper engraving reproductions for mass sale. Under the name Daniel Heimlich, Schenau also published etchings of views from the area around Paris.

Many of his works are now lost or destroyed, such as the altarpiece of the Holy Cross Church in Dresden, which he had worked on from 1788 to 1792; a fire in 1897 destroyed the nave and the altar which was replaced by a work by Anton Dietrich (1833-1904).

Most of his surviving works are now in museums in Saxony. A few of his works, such as "Elector of Saxony's Family" (1772) and "The Art Discussion" (1777), can be found in the Dresden State Art Collections. Many works are in the "Deutsches Damast-und Frottiermuseum" in his hometown of Großschönau.

== Work ==
=== Example: Das Kunstgespräch (The Art Discussion) ===
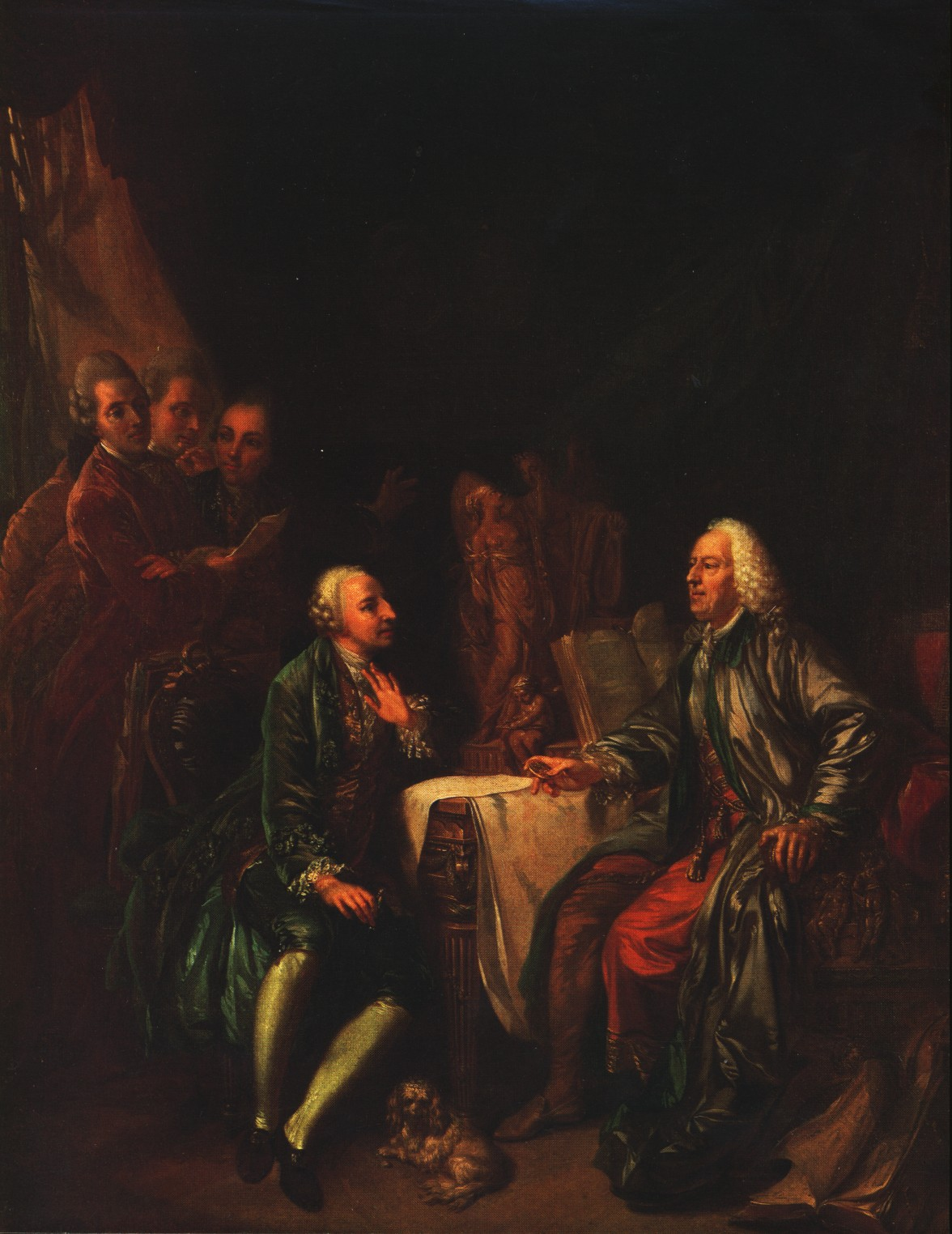
The Art Discussion (1777)

This important work of 1777 shows, in the foreground on the right, the Saxon statesman, Thomas Fritsch (1700-1775), together with Christian Ludwig von Hagedorn, art theorist and collector. Both are engrossed in a conversation about art. On the table between them, allegorical figures representing painting, sculpture and poetry can be seen. Amongst those listening in the background are painters Adrian Zingg (left), Schenau himself and Anton Graff.

=== Other works ===
- Der doppelte Verlust (1770)
- Die kurfürstlich-sächsische Familie (1772)
- Priamus bittet Achilles um die Leiche Hektors (1775)
- Das Kunstgespräch (1777)
- Ehepaar in der Laube (1785)
- Selbstportrait (1785)
- Auferstehung Christi (1786)
- Kreuzigung Christi (1788–1792)
- Christus am Ölberg (1795)
- Familienszene (1800)
- Unterzeichnung des Ehevertrages (1802)

== See also ==
- List of German painters

== Bibliography ==
- Schenau. In: Heinrich Keller (Hrsg.): Nachrichten von allen in Dresden lebenden Künstlern. Dyk, Leipzig 1789, S. 143–155.
- G. F. Otto: Lexikon der Oberlausitzischen Schriftsteller und Künstler. Band 3, Abt. 1. Görlitz 1803, S. 192–197.
- Schenau, Johann Eleazar. In: Georg Kaspar Nagler (Hrsg.): Neues allgemeines Künstler-Lexicon. Band 15. Fleischmann, München 1845, S. 181–184.
- Moritz Wießner: Die Akademie der bildenen Künste zu Dresden. Dresden 1864, S. 56f.
- David Goldberg: Catalog zur Illustration der öffentlichen Vorträge über Johann Eleazar Schenau (Zeißig). Richard Menzel, Zittau 1878.
- Fr. August Czischkowsky (Hrsg.): Zeit- und Ortsgeschichte von Großschönau. Großschönau 1887, S. 643ff.
- L. W. Schmidt: Johann Eleazar Zeissig, genannt Schenau. Diss., Heidelberg 1926.
- H. Marx: ...den guten Geschmack einzuführen.“ Zum 250. Geburtstag von Johann Eleazar Zeissig, genannt Schenau. In: Dresdner Kunstblätter. 32, 1988, S. 10–18.
- Der Brockhaus Kunst. 2. Auflage. Brockhaus, Leipzig 2001, S. 1034.
- Anke Fröhlich: ...Grazie und erhaben“. Die Werke des Oberlausitzer Malers Johann Eleazar Zeissig, gen. Schenau (1737–1806) im Kulturhistorischen Museum zu Görlitz. In: Görlitzer Magazin. 19, 2006, S. 12–31.
- Anke Fröhlich: ...mit seinen schönen Ideen und sanften Pinseln“. Der Dresdner Genremaler und Akademiedirektor Johann Eleazar Zeissig, gen. Schenau. In: Dresdner Kunstblätter. 51, 2007, S. 180–196.
