= Rebberg (Mulhouse) =

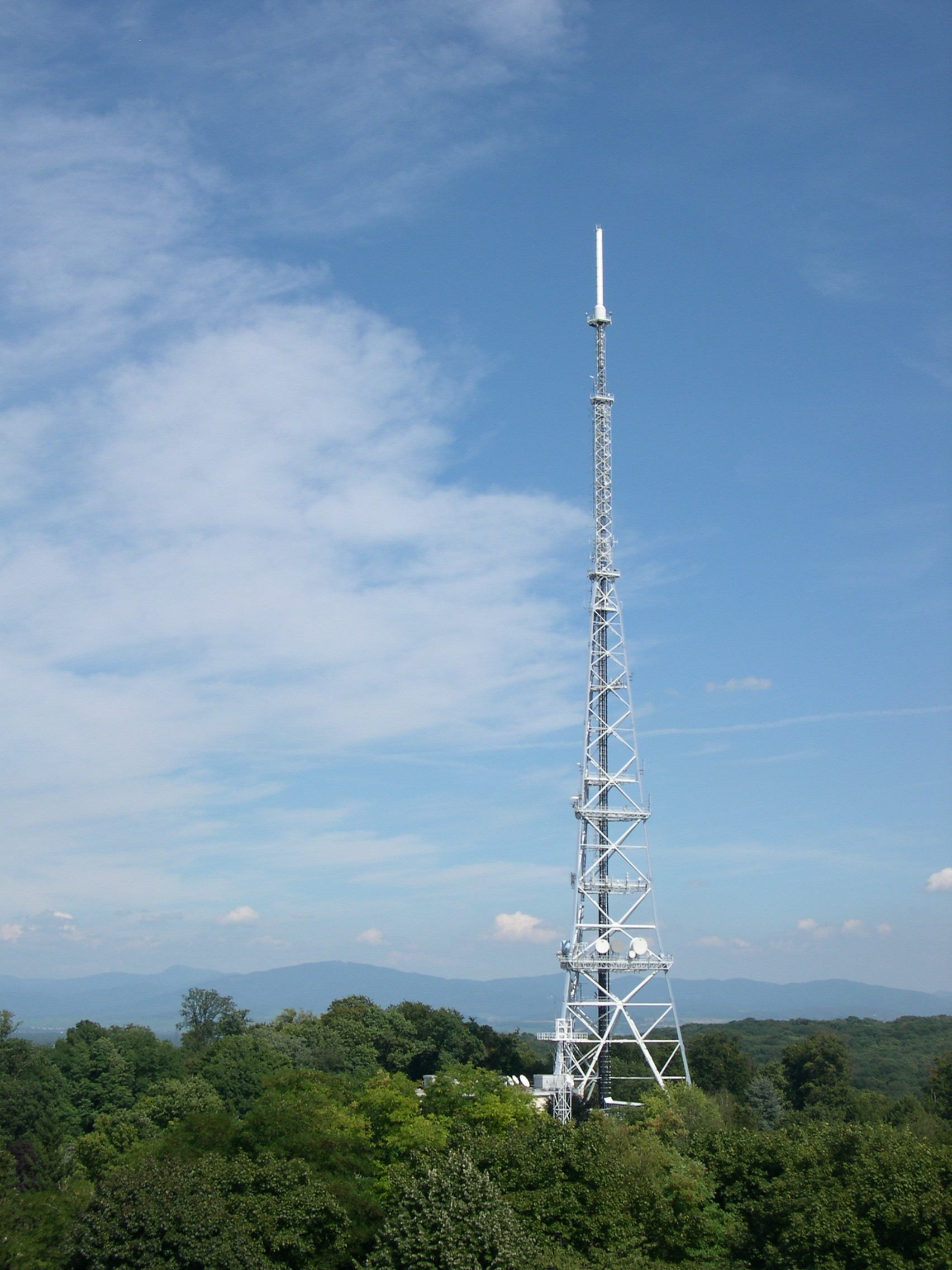
- The radio tower on the Rebberg

Highest point
- Elevation: 327 m (1,073 ft)
- Coordinates: 47°44′10″N 7°20′35″E

Geography
- Location within France
- Location: France

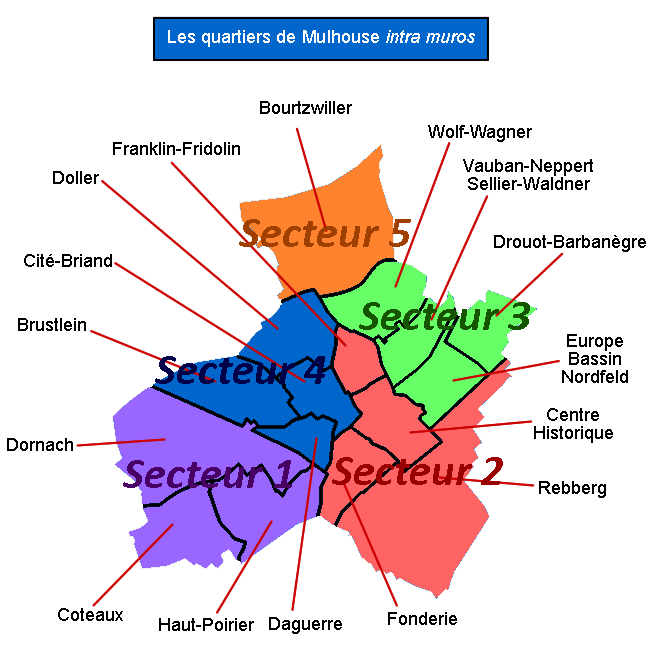
The suburbs in sectors

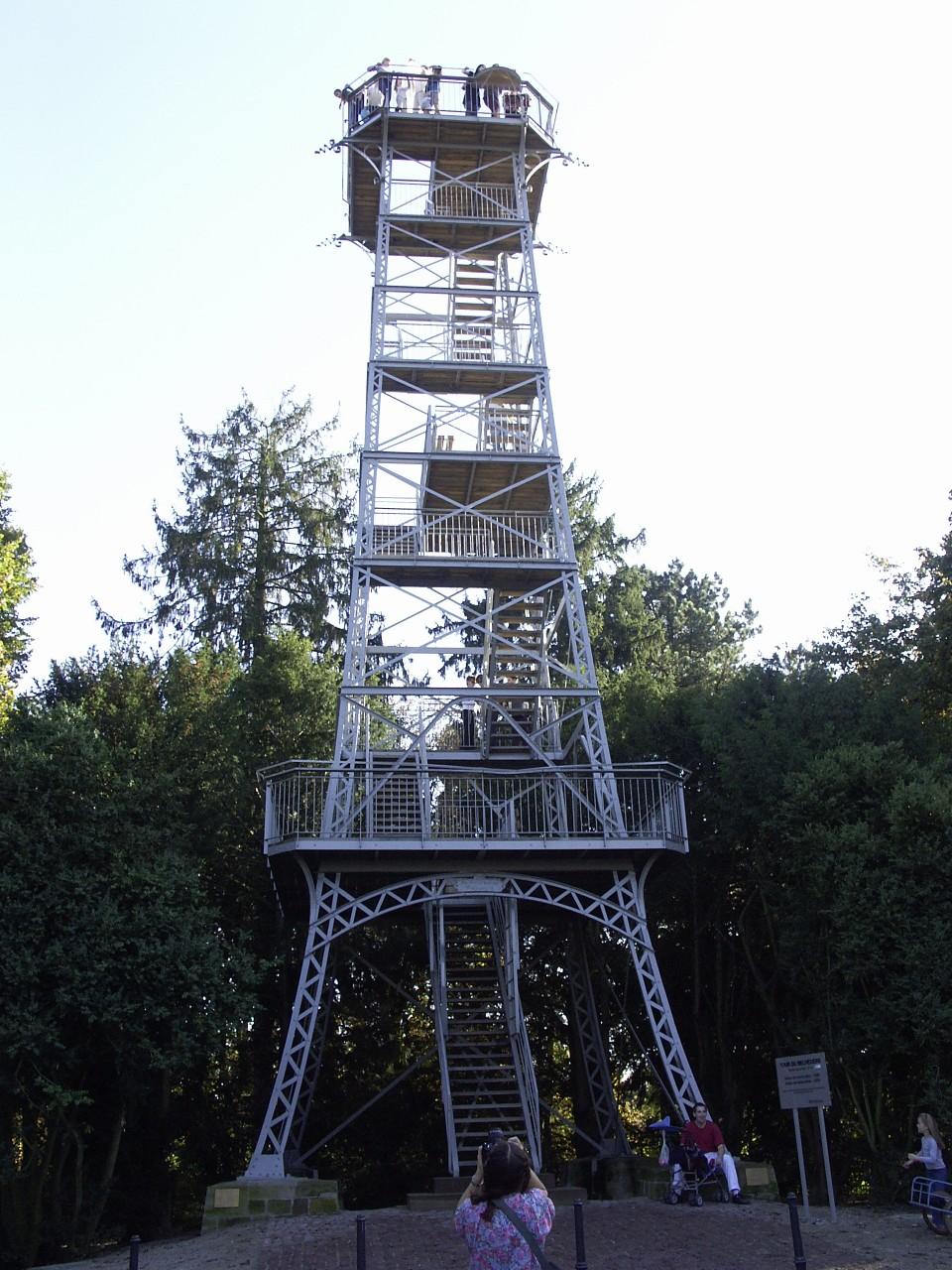
The observation tower

Rebberg is a mountain and suburb of Mulhouse in Alsace, France.

== Etymology ==
"Rebberg" is a German and Alemannic word describing a "vineyard" on a slope.

In Mulhouse there is another suburb which is called “Coteaux”. This French word can also be translated as "vineyard".

Therefore you should always be careful not to confuse the two suburbs.

== Urban Structure ==
For administrative purposes Mulhouse has been subdivided into different sectors. Rebberg belongs to sector 2.

== Location ==
The Rebberg is located in the south of the city along the railway line and part of the mountain belongs to the neighboring municipalities Riedisheim and Brunstatt. Consequently it will be helpful to clarify which Rebberg is meant, that of Mulhouse, Riedisheim or Brunstatt.

== Geographical Features ==
The Rebberg is characterized by its protuberant shape. Its high hills represent geomorphologically the northern end of the Sundgau. Thus it dominates the rest of Mulhouse, the plain of the Ochsenfeld (potassium basin) in the northeast and the Hardt forest in the east. Its shape impacted on the layout of the Rhone–Rhine Canal and the railroad along its bottom.

== Urban Features ==
The residential area of the upper middle class has its origins in the golden era of the history of this "French Manchester" during the heyday of the textile industry of Mulhouse. Here are many mansions which seem to excel each other with styles marked by different architectural influences and periods.

== Zoo ==
The Zoological and Botanical Park of Mulhouse which is an example of a scenic ensemble is located in the heart of this green zone.

== Towers ==
On the Rebberg are two metal towers:

• The Tour du Belvédère is a 65 feet high observation tower. It is open to the public and offers a panoramic view of the region.

• The radio tower Émetteur du Belvédère is in fact the relay station Mulhouse of TDF, a company which until 2004 was called TéléDiffusion de France. It has a height of 636 ft.
