= Mulhouse Zoological and Botanical Park =

Parc Zoologique et Botanique de Mulhouse
- Park logo
- Interactive map of Parc Zoologique et Botanique de Mulhouse
- 47.7345°N 7.3507°E
- Date opened: 1868
- Location: Mulhouse, Grand Est, France
- Land area: 25 ha (62 acres)
- No. of animals: 900
- No. of species: 190
- Memberships: BGCI, EAZA, WAZA
- Website: www.zoo-mulhouse.com/en/

The Mulhouse Zoological and Botanical Park is a French zoological park located in the Grand Est region in the departement of Haut-Rhin, in the southeast of the city of Mulhouse, district of Rebberg. Created in 1868 by philanthropists industrialists, led by Charles Thierry-Mieg son, he was successively the property of the Cercle mulhousien, of the Industrial Society of Mulhouse, and then of the City from 1893. It is now managed by the agglomeration community of Mulhouse region, Mulhouse Alsace Agglomération. Its director is, since 2010, the veterinary Brice Lefaux.

Located on the edge of the Tannenwald forest, it covers 25 hectares and present more than 900 animals of 170 species, as well as 3,500 plant varieties. Among the major park facilities are the Grand Nord area dedicated to Arctic wildlife (polar bears, muskoxen, arctic foxes...) and an Asian multispecies pen. The park holds the national label "remarkable garden" of the ministry of Culture for its botanical collections: remarkable trees, irises, peonies and rhododendrons gardens.

The zoo, which is a permanent member of the European Association of Zoos and Aquaria (EAZA), is engaged in ex situ conservation by participating in European Endangered Species Programmes (EEP), which it coordinates nine of them (for five species of monkeys, three species of lemurs and one species of wallaby). It also supports in situ conservation associations working in the field and have already reintroduced animals in their natural environment, in France and in Africa. It is also a member of the World Association of Zoos and Aquariums (WAZA) and of Botanic Gardens Conservation International (BGCI).

In 2014, it was the eleventh zoological park of France in terms of frequentation, with 400,000 visitors.

== History ==
The park was created in 1868 as a 4-hectare (9.9-acre) romantic landscape garden, funded by industrial philanthropists, with a zoo whose collection included kangaroo, deer and birds. In the war of 1870, however, the park was shut and its animals sold. After it changed owners twice, the city purchased the park in 1893, and it has remained in municipal ownership since. Although heavily damaged during World War II, it was restored by 1950.

== Animals ==
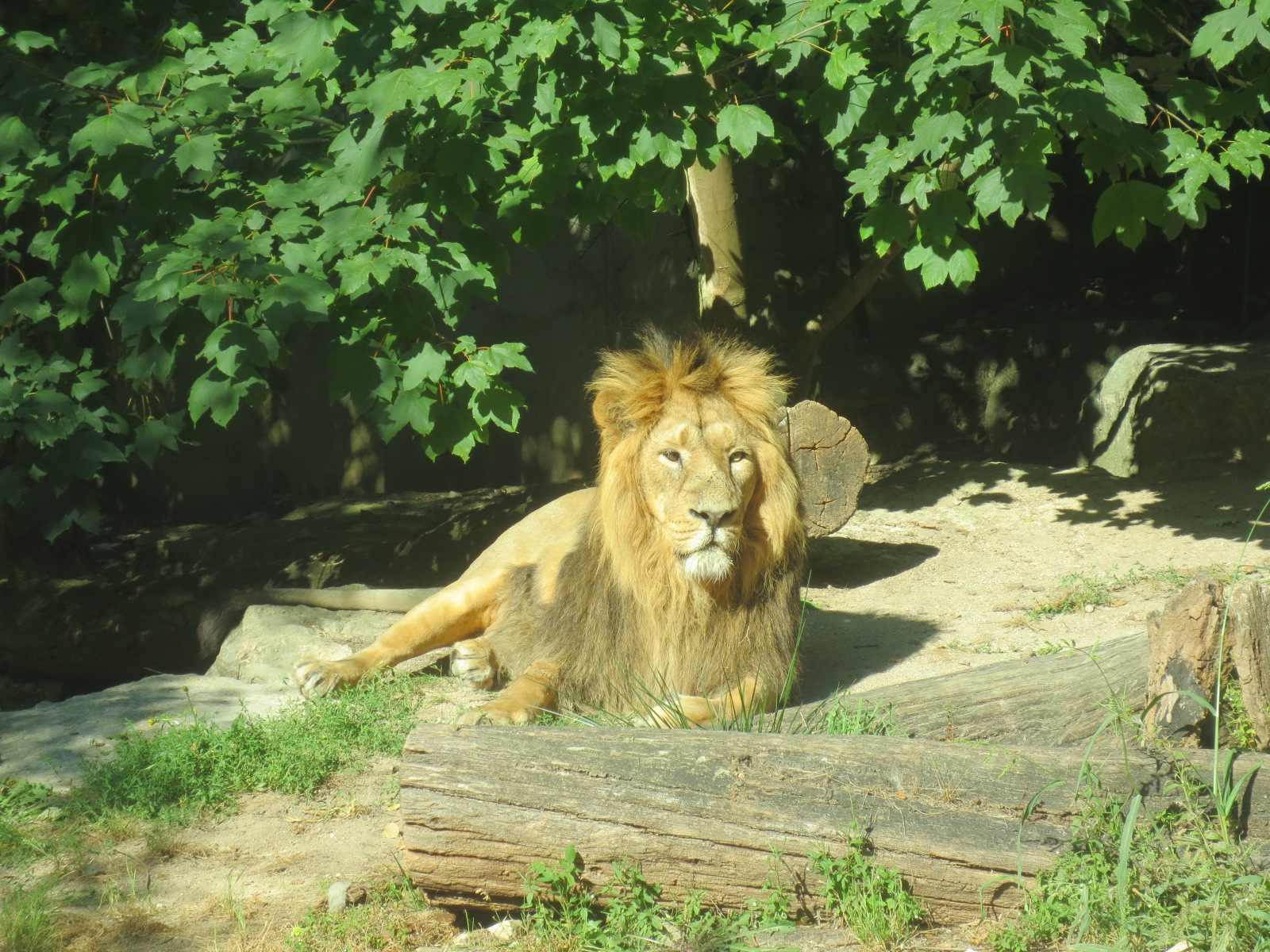
Male Asiatic lion.

Today the zoo keeps more than 900 animals representing 170 species, including many species of tropical birds and monkeys, and 94 species that are rare and endangered, and is dedicated to preserving rare species of plants and animals.

In the children's zoo, visitors can walk through the enclosure and approach and touch the animals, which include Moroccan dwarf goats, Indian Runner ducks, brahma cocks, and red river hogs. Other animals which can be seen in this area include rabbits, Poitou donkeys, and llamas. There is a play area next to the children's zoo.

== Gardens ==
The park contains 400 kinds of iris in spring and 100 cultivars (varieties) of dahlias in summer, trees shaped into fantastic forms, and a collection of rare and endangered plants that includes Catharanthus from Madagascar (7 taxa), Canary Islands (22 taxa), and Madeira (11 taxa). It also features a garden of the senses for the blind, with signs in braille and plants chosen for their smell and touch. The park is listed by the French Ministry of Culture as one of the Remarkable Gardens of France.

== Educational Mission ==
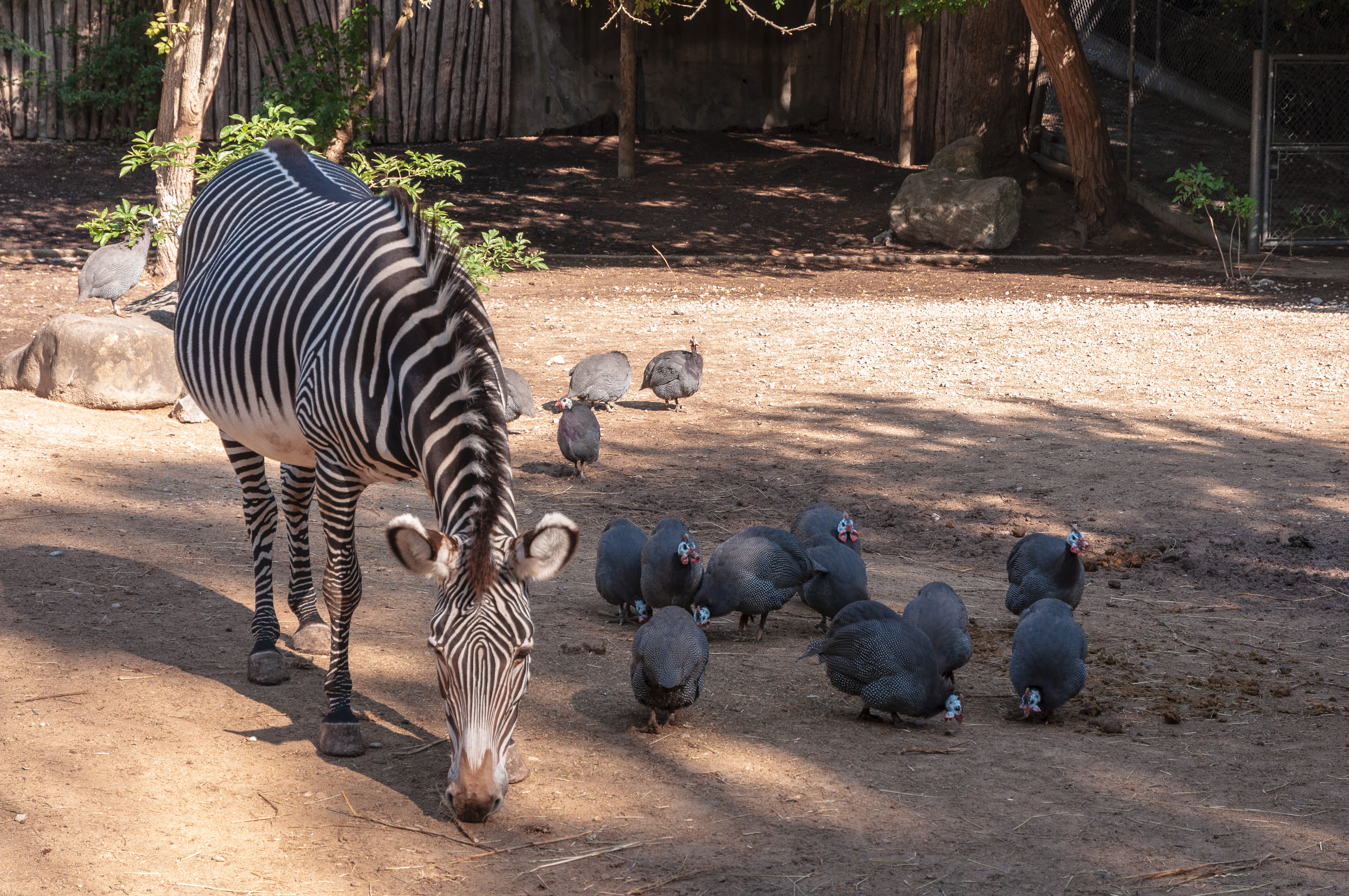
Grévy's zebra and helmeted guineafowl.

The Mulhouse Zoological and Botanical Park aims to provide guidance and information, working to pass on knowledge to the public. Approximately 13,000 children visit each year. The park offers consultation and support through partnership and collaboration with teachers on school projects, the park's education department, recreational centers, and extracurricular programs.

== See also ==
- List of botanical gardens in France
