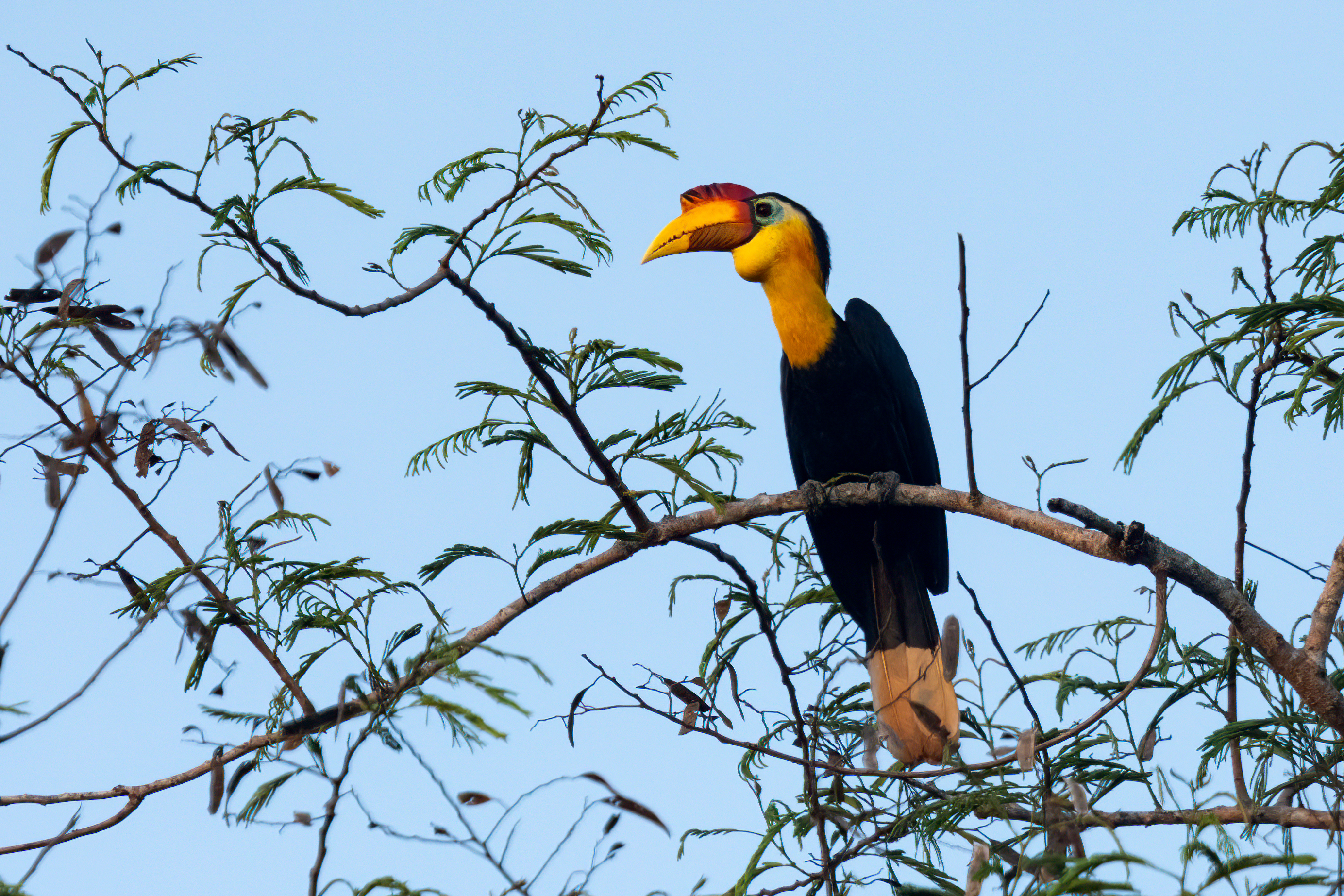

Conservation status
- Endangered (IUCN 3.1)

Scientific classification
- Kingdom: Animalia
- Phylum: Chordata
- Class: Aves
- Order: Bucerotiformes
- Family: Bucerotidae
- Genus: Rhabdotorrhinus
- Species: R. corrugatus

Binomial name
- Rhabdotorrhinus corrugatus (Temminck, 1832)
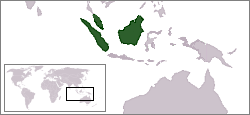
- Wrinkled hornbill range

Synonyms
- Rhyticeros corrugatus Aceros corrugatus

= Wrinkled hornbill =

Species of bird

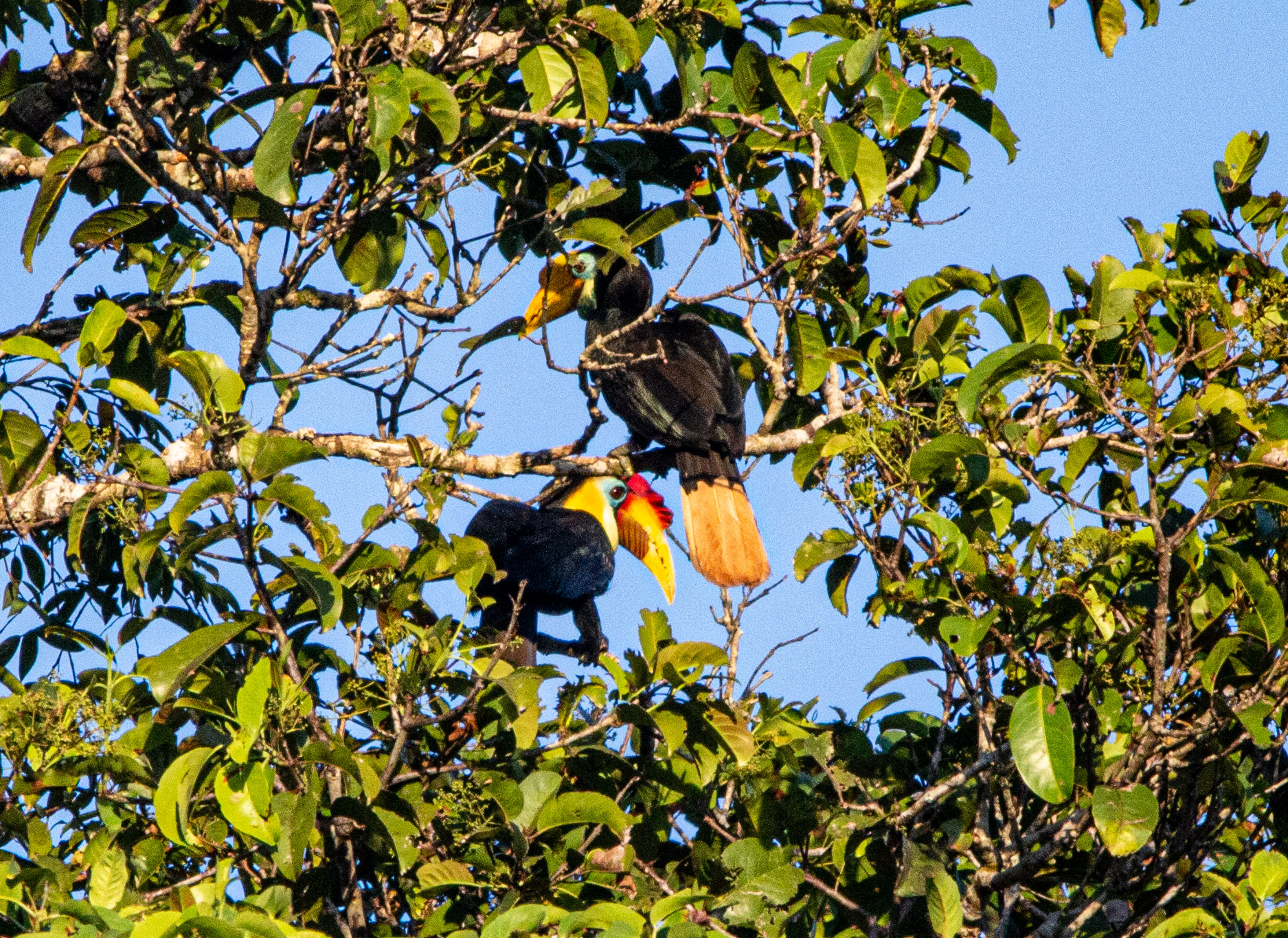
Belait District, Brunei, Borneo, female and male Wrinkled hornbill

The wrinkled hornbill or Sunda wrinkled hornbill (Rhabdotorrhinus corrugatus) is a medium-large hornbill which is found in forest in the Thai-Malay Peninsula, Sumatra and Borneo.

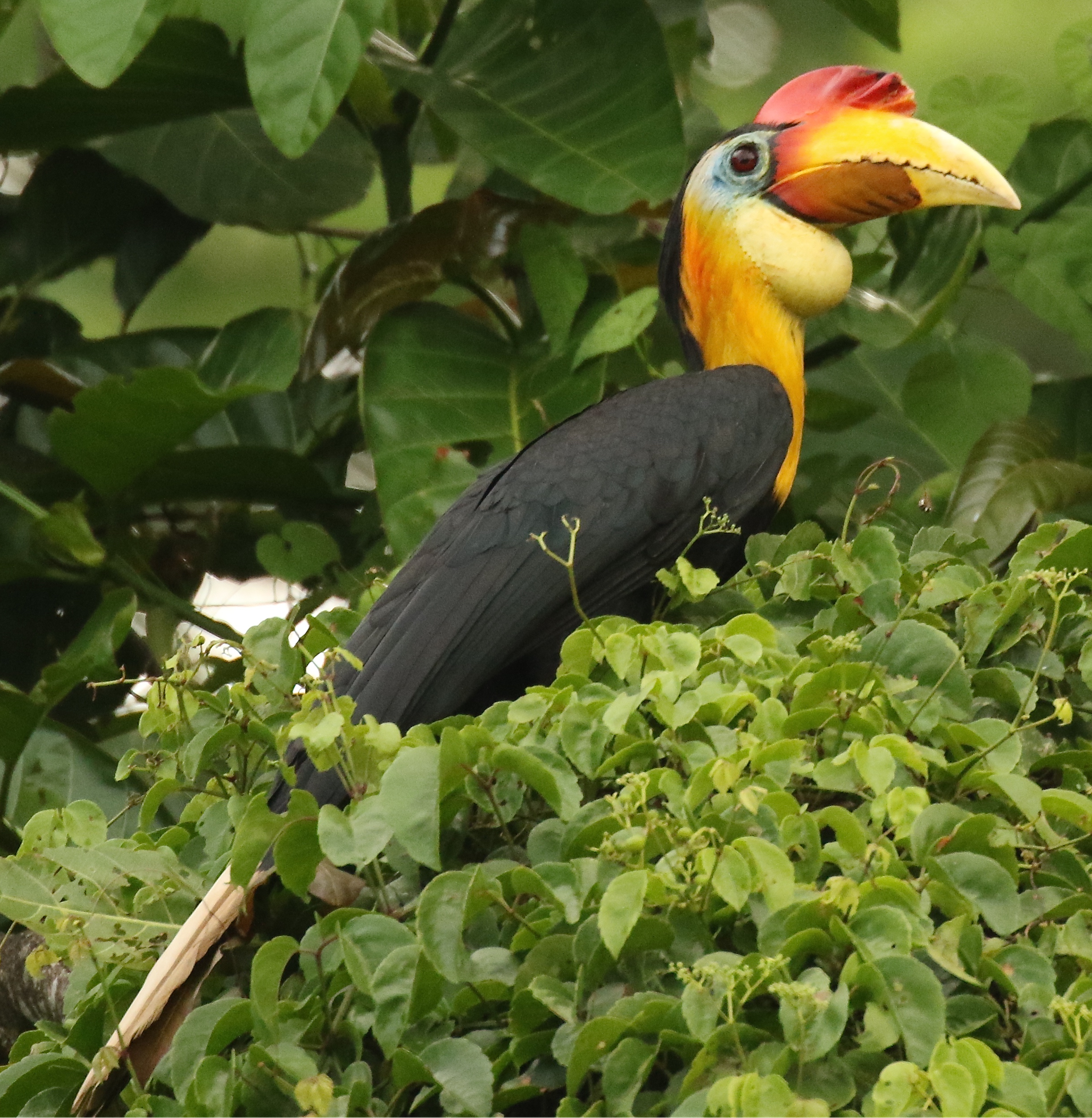
Sukau Rainforest Lodge, Kinabatangen River - Sabah, Borneo - Malaysia

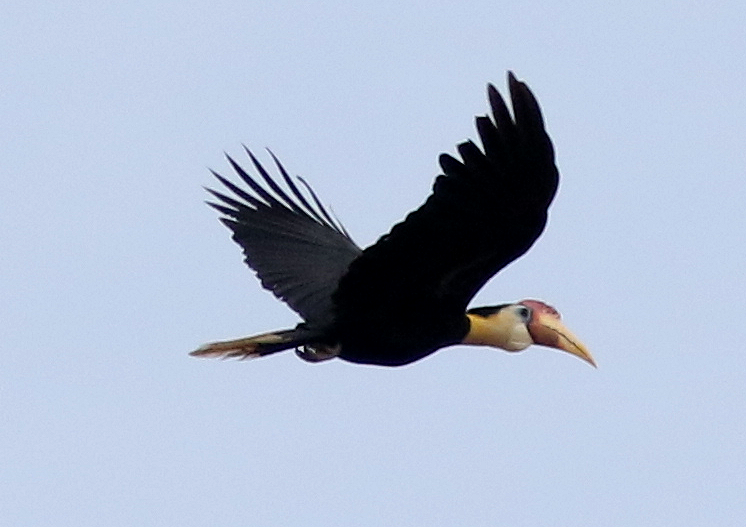
Sukau Rainforest Lodge, Kinabatangen River - Sabah, Borneo - Malaysia

The wrinkled hornbill is around 70 cm long, and has a very large bill that is fused to the skull. It has mainly black plumage, a blue eye-ring, and a broadly white or rufous-tipped tail. The male and female have different head and bill patterns. Males have bright yellow feathers on the auriculars, cheeks, throat, neck-sides and chest, but these areas are black in the female, except for the blue throat. The bill of the male is yellow with a red base and casque, and a brownish basal half of the lower mandible. The bill and casque of the female is almost entirely yellow.

This is a forest species and eats mainly fruit, such as figs, although it will also eat small animals such as frogs and insects. Wrinkled hornbills do not drink, but get the water they need from their food. Their call is a harsh "Kak-kak", or a deep "Row-wow" which can be heard for miles.

These birds are monogamous and remain in a pair for life. They use holes found in trees for nests, and the female will plaster over the entrance with mud and droppings, leaving a nesting mother and her chicks only a small hole, too small for them to exit. They are fed exclusively by the male, who regurgitates food for them. After several months, when the chicks are ready, the female will break out of her nest.

Wrinkled hornbills were first bred in captivity in 1988. Heavy deforestation in their forest habitat has led them to be uplisted from near threatened to endangered on the IUCN Red List in 2018.
