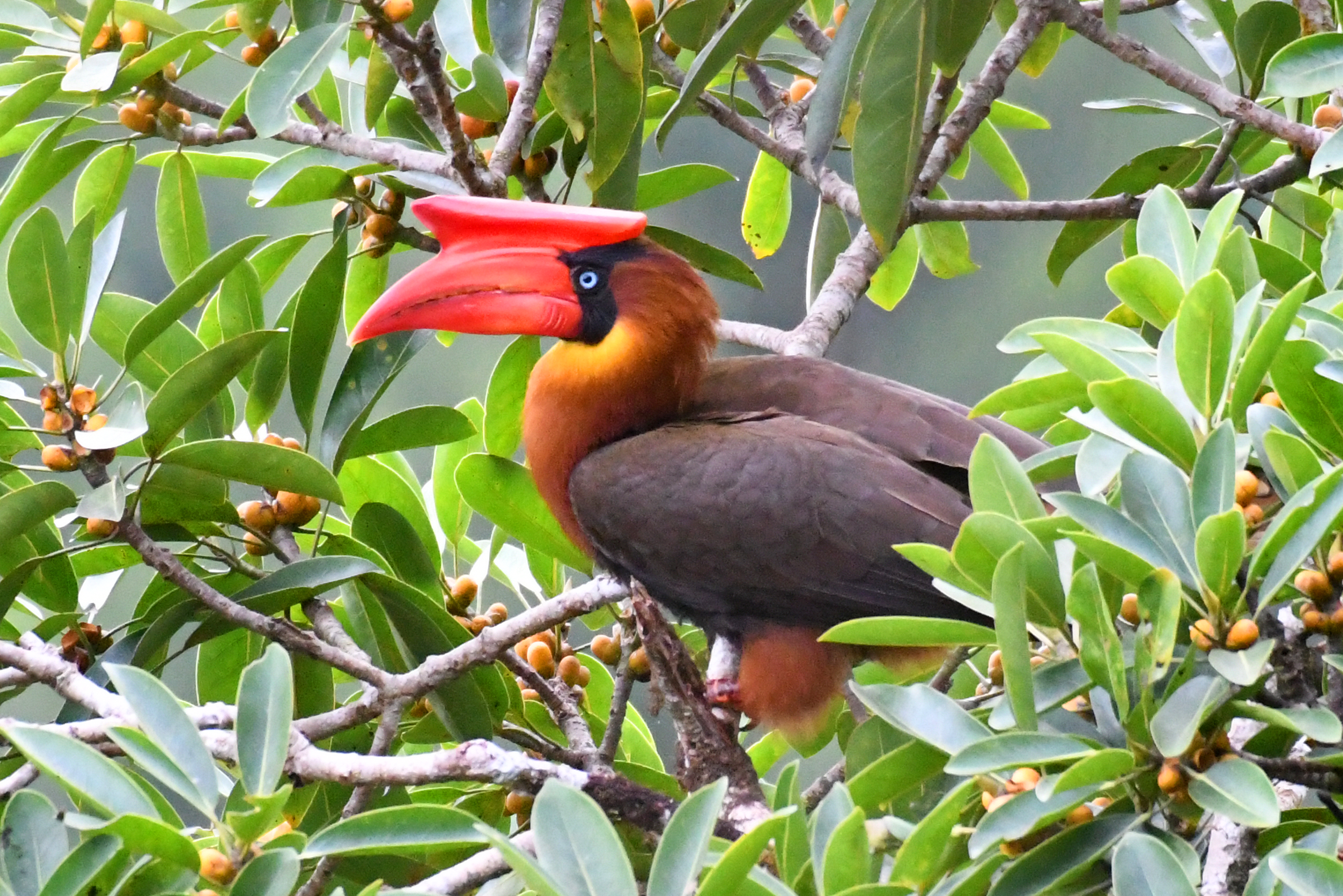
- A female Northern Rufous Hornbill ssp. hydrocorax
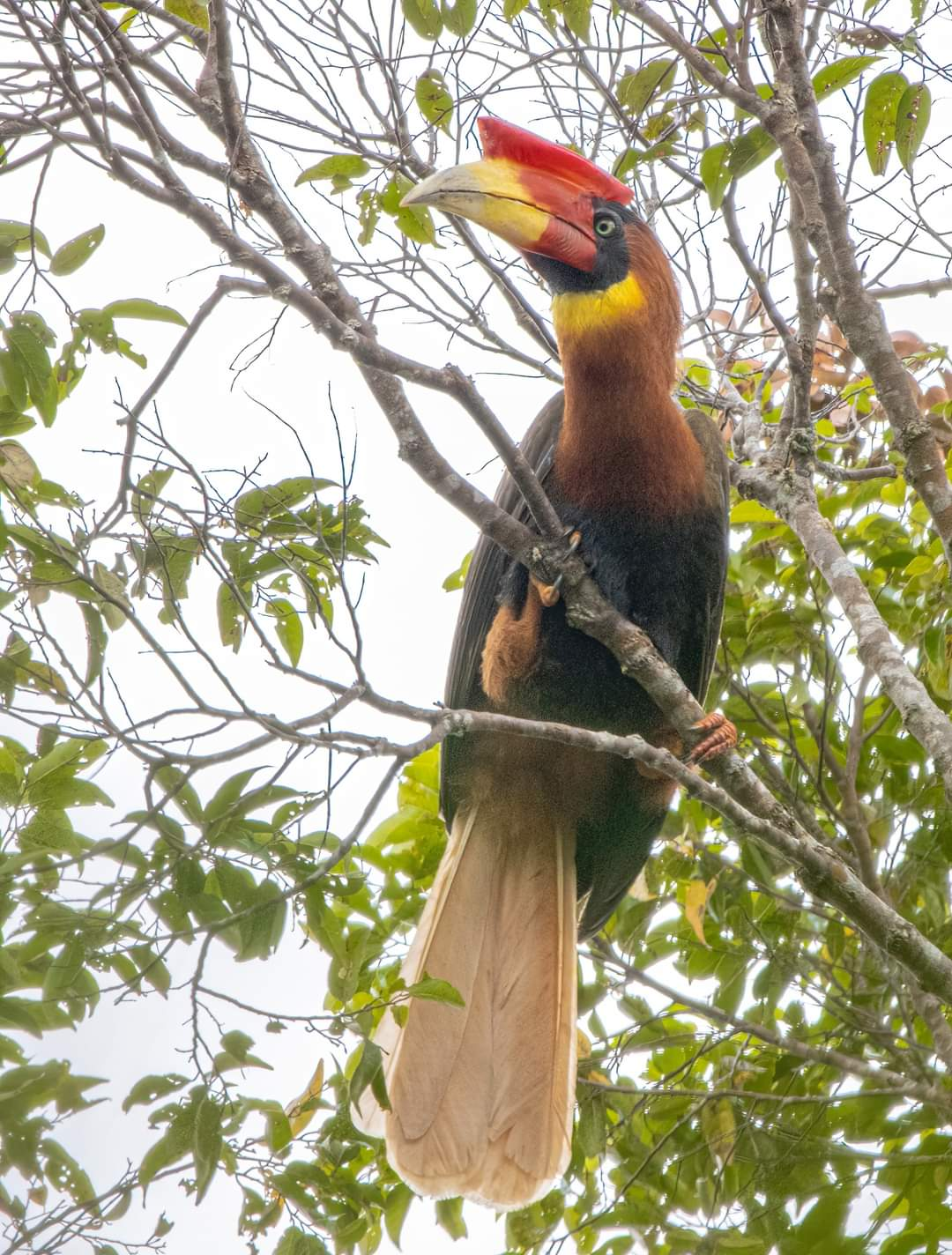
- A male Southern Rufous Hornbill ssp. mindanensis

Conservation status
- Vulnerable (IUCN 3.1)
- CITES Appendix II

Scientific classification
- Kingdom: Animalia
- Phylum: Chordata
- Class: Aves
- Order: Bucerotiformes
- Family: Bucerotidae
- Genus: Buceros
- Species: B. hydrocorax

Binomial name
- Buceros hydrocorax Linnaeus, 1766

Synonyms
- Buceros mindanensis Tweeddale, 1877

= Rufous hornbill =

Species of bird

The rufous hornbill (Buceros hydrocorax), also known as the Philippine hornbill and locally as kalaw (pronounced KAH-lau), is a large species of hornbill endemic to the Philippines (the largest hornbill in the country). It is called the "clock-of-the-mountains" by locals, because of its loud booming call which typically occurs every hour. Rufous hornbills inhabit moist tropical lowland forest areas, and are now regarded as a threatened species. Reasons for decline include habitat destruction, hunting and poaching for the illegal pet trade.

It is illegal to hunt, capture or possess rufous hornbills under Philippine Law RA 9147.

== Description and taxonomy ==
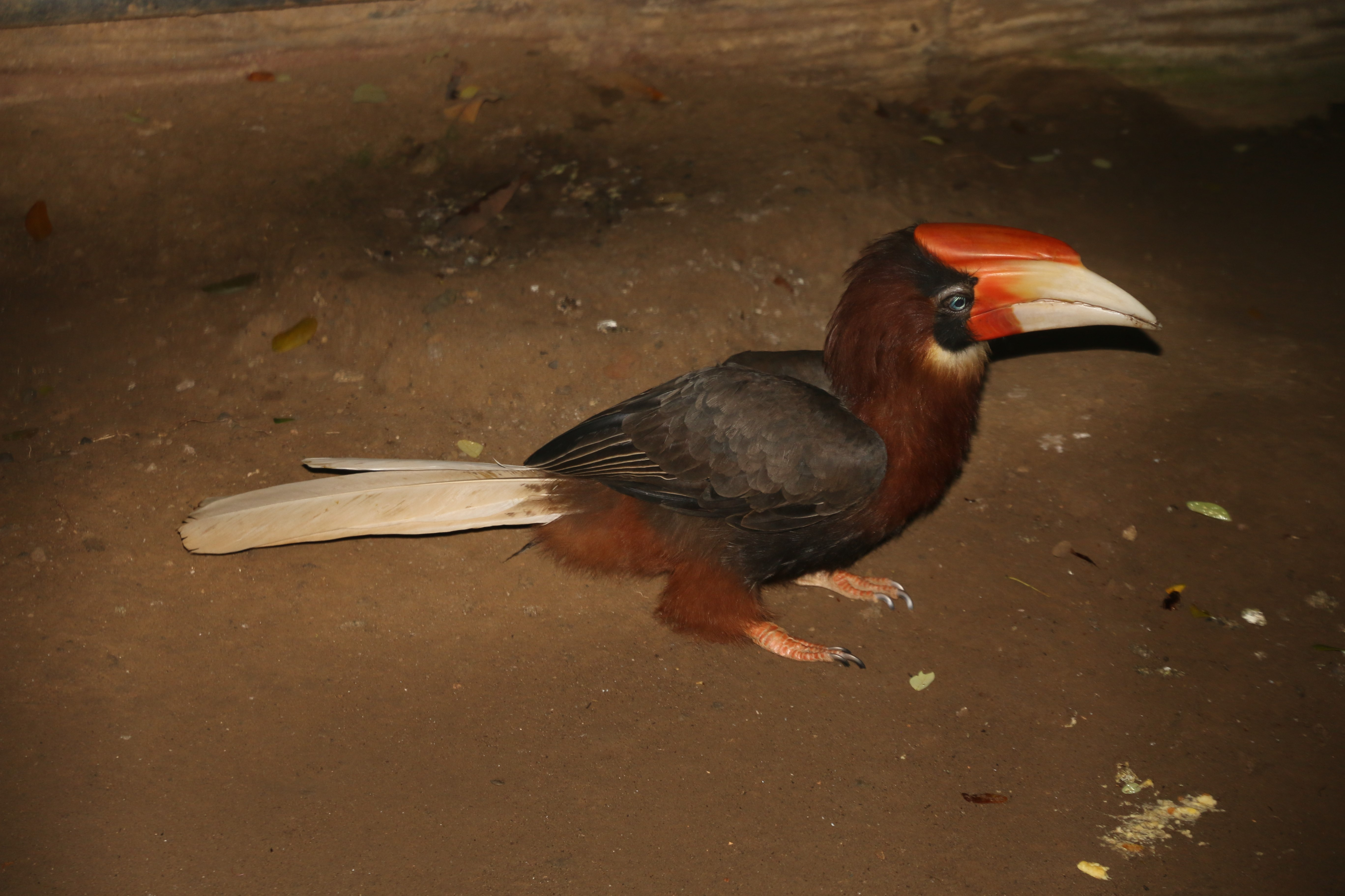
A captive ssp. semigaleatus

The bird is endemic to the Philippines, where it occurs in primary, mature secondary, and disturbed forests, and is found across majority of the country except the regions of Mimaropa, Sulu and Western Visayas.

Its described as a large bird with a dark body, rufous legs, chest and neck, an off-white tail and a black fack faced and a yellow thorat. The bill of the nominate subspecies is entirely red, while the bill of the subspecies semigaleatus and mindanensis are pale yellow on the distal half. Birds are sexually dimorphic in which females have striking electric blue eyes, a smaller casque and no eye ring while males have yellow eyes and a larger casque.

Its striking red bill is caused by the oxidation of oils produced by the uropygial gland.

=== Subspecies ===
Three subspecies are recognized:

- B. h. hydrocorax – Linnaeus, 1766: Luzon and Marinduque, Larger with an all red bill, large casque Now extinct on Marinduque;
- B. h. semigaelatus – Tweeddale, 1878: Samar, Leyte, Bohol, Panaon, Biliran, Calicoan and Buad; Yellow front half of beak; flatter top of head with the casque (horn) smaller and merges into the maxilla;
- B. h. mindanensis – Tweeddale, 1877: Dinagat, Siargao, Mindanao (plus Balut, Bucas and Talicud) and Basilan; Yellow front half of beak; large casque;

The HBW and BirdLife International Illustrated Checklist of the Birds of the World has split this into two species with the Northern Rufous Hornbill consisting of the nominate and the Southern Rufous Hornbill consisting of the semigaelatus and mindanensis subspecies.

== Behaviour and ecology ==
It is sometimes called "the clock of the mountains" because of its periodic noontime call which can be heard up to 1.5 kilometers away. Due to its large size, its wings make a distinct whirring sound in flight. It has been recorded to have been preyed upon by the Philippine eagle.

Seen in flocks of up to 12 birds, the Southern rufous hornbill is occasionally seen with Writhed hornbills forming flocks of up to 20.

=== Feeding ===
Rufous Hornbills play a crucial role in maintaining the balance of their ecosystem. They are considered a keystone species due to their omnivorous feeding habits, which allow them to disperse seeds along the forest floor from the fruits they consume and control pest populations of insects they predate on.

=== Breeding ===
Recorded to lay eggs from March to May but juveniles have been seen as late as November in Luzon. It nests in cavities of large dipterocarp trees 15 to 30 meters above the ground.

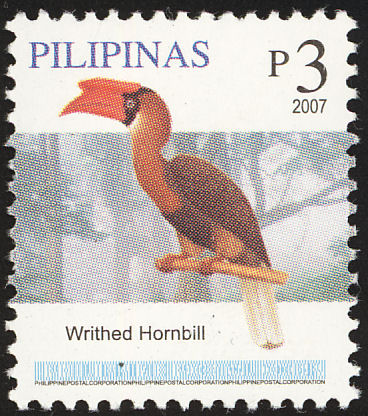
A 2007 Philippine postal stamp incorrectly labelling a Rufous hornbill as a Writhed hornbill

As with other hornbills, females seal themselves within the nest cavity, where they lay the clutch, and remain with the growing young for most or all of the nesting period. In some species, the male helps with the sealing process from outside the nest cavity. The females lays 2 large white eggs, which has weighed 465 to 480 grams. The nestlings and the female are fed by the male through a narrow vertical slit in the sealed nest opening, at times joined by non-breeding helper males. Nesting time will last in average of 4–6 months. In this duration the male will provide food to his confine female and nestling. They are monogamous and maintain the year- pair bonds and will be paired together for many years’ time and engage a courtship feeding.

== Habitat and conservation status ==
This species occurs largely in primary evergreen dipterocarp forests, but also uses secondary forest. The Northern rufous hornbill has recorded up to 760 meters in Luzon while its southern counterpart has been recorded up to 2,100 meters above sea level on Mt. Apo.

This species has been classified as vulnerable. It is believed that the North Rufous Hornbill is more threatened as the National List of Threatened Terrestrial Fauna of the Philippines has classified it and Endangered while classifying the southern species or sub-species as Vulnerable.

This species suffers from substantial hunting pressure and widespread loss of habitat as a result of logging and conversion to agriculture. Continued subsistence hunting and felling of remnant dipterocarp forests for agriculture are thought to be further depressing population numbers, and the range is now highly fragmented and likely suffering from an acute lack of suitable nesting trees, at least in parts of the range. Hunters climb up nesting trees to capture the mother and its chicks for the illegal wildlife trade. Hunting for sport and food has been recorded throughout its range.

The Northern rufous hornbill occurs in a few protected areas such as Quezon Protected Landscape, Bataan National Park, Northern Sierra Madre Natural Park, Aurora Memorial National Park and Kalbario–Patapat Natural Park. The Southern rufous hornbill occurs in Samar Island Natural Park, Mount Apo, Pasonanca Natural Park. However, despite occurring in numerous protected areas, actual protection from illegal logging, hunting and capture for the wildlife trade is lax.

In 2014 in Adams, Ilocos Norte, the Vice-Mayor's son was photographed carrying a deceased juvenile that he had just shot. This species has gone locally extinct in Cavite in Mt. Palay-palay due to hunting and the construction of roads and the Kaybiang Tunnel.

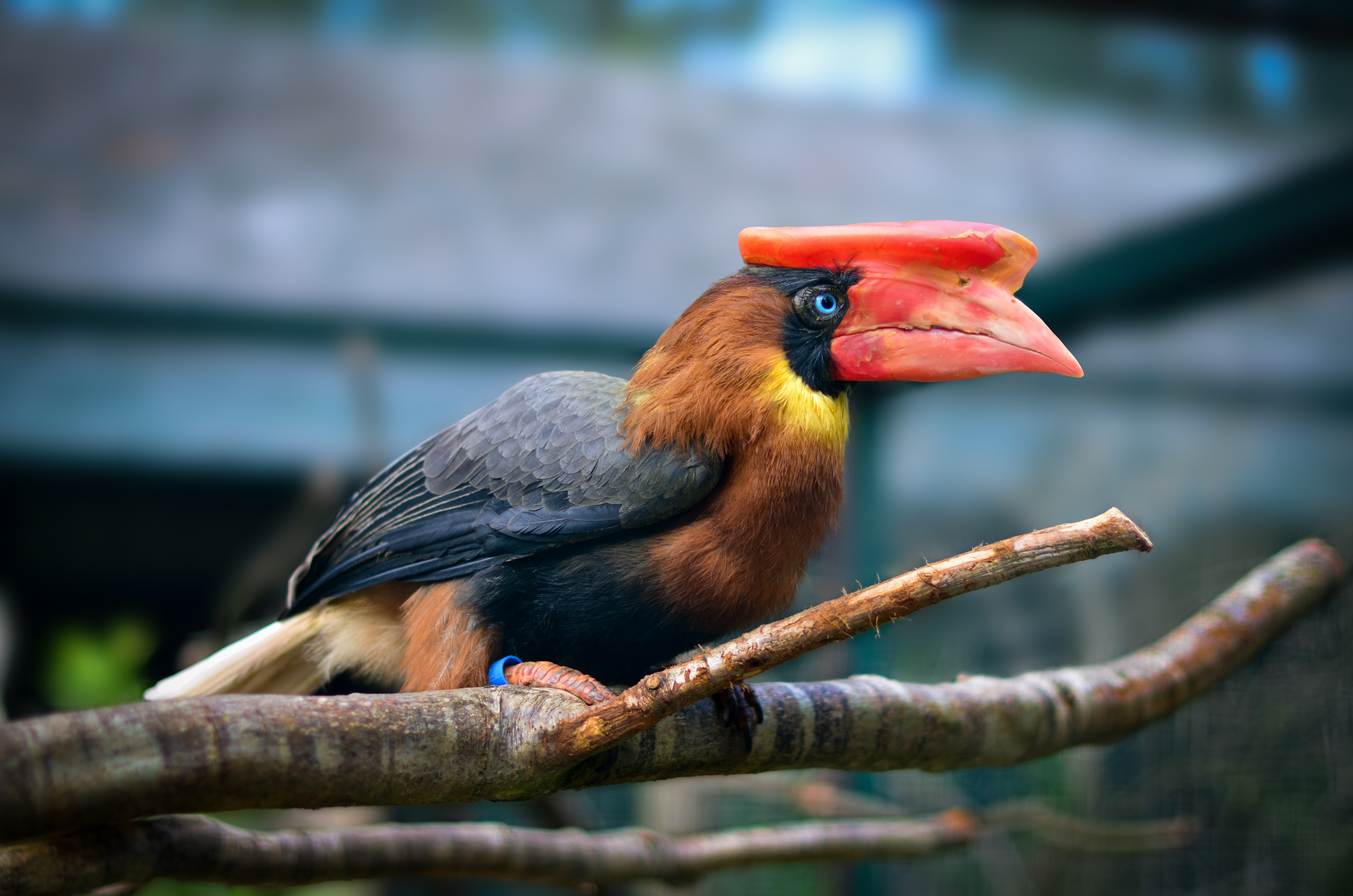
A captive female ssp. hydrocorax

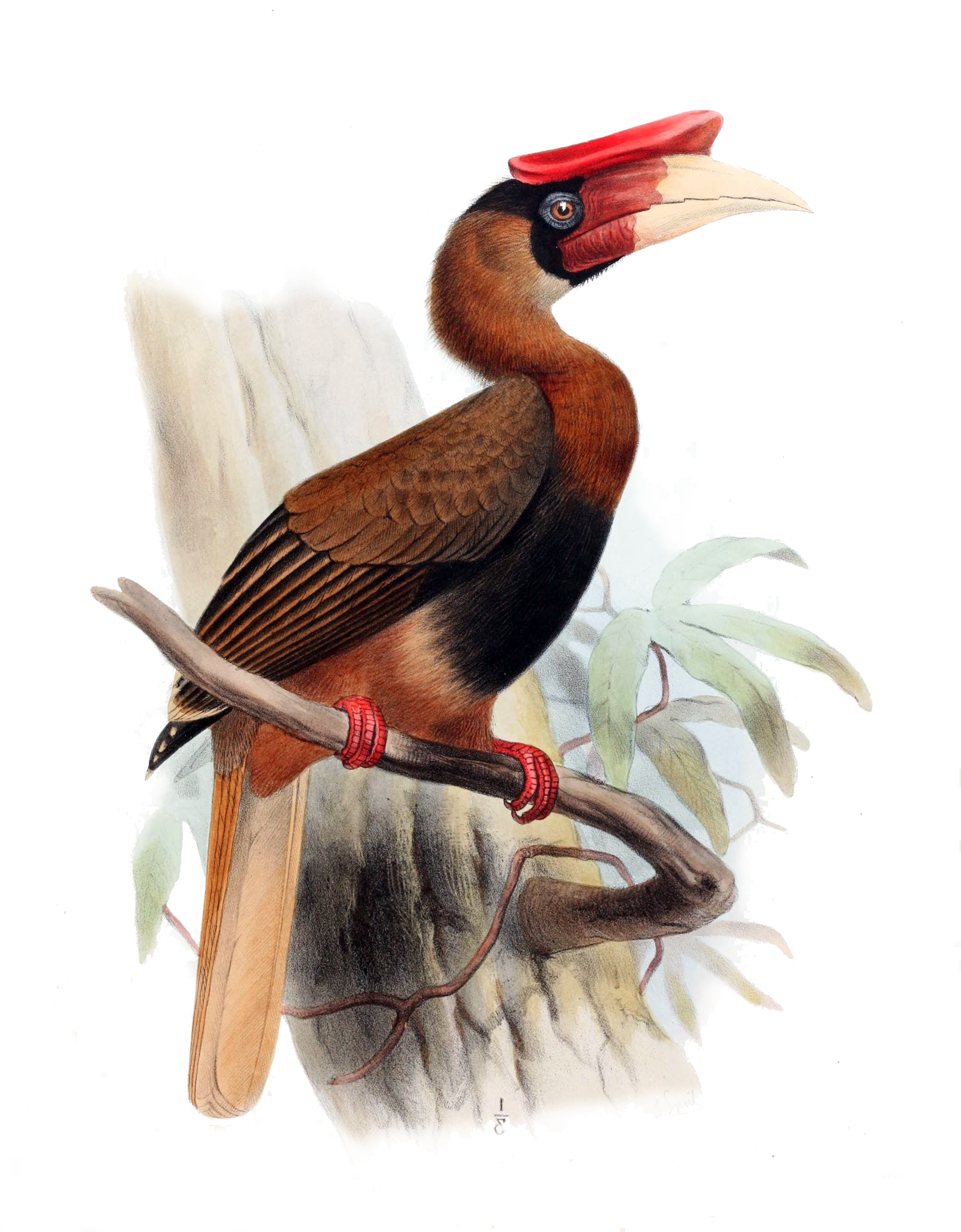
Subspecies B. h. mindanensis; illustration by Joseph Smit, 1881
