= August Wilhelm Rehberg =

German politician and writer

- Born: 13 January 1757; Hannover
- Died: 10 August 1836 (aged 79); Göttingen

Education
- Education: University of Göttingen

Philosophical work
- Region: Western philosophy
- Main interests: Kantian philosophy

August Wilhelm Rehberg (13 January 1757 – 10 August 1836) was a German philosopher.

== Critique of Kant ==
Reidar Maliks (associate professor at University of Oslo) calls Friedrich von Gentz and August Wilhelm Rehberg “Kant’s conservative critics”, who had an influence on the way the principles of civil freedom and equality were presented in Kant’s 1790s works. Gentz and Rehberg, who lodged objections to Kant’s political ideas in the winter of 1792/93, were then in the civil service: Gentz in Berlin (Prussia) and Rehberg in Hanover (then a British city). And both were acquainted with Kant. Rehberg was his follower so far as concerns the philosophy of mathematics. However, being a supporter of the estate-based system, he bitterly resented the revolution in France. Gentz met Kant during his study at the University of Königsberg. Initially, he welcomed the revolution from the perspective of Kant’s practical philosophy. But soon afterwards, in 1792, when war was already a daunting prospect, Gentz translated Edmund Burke’s Reflections on the Revolution in France and irrevocably moved over to the side of the conservatives.
