= Snuff bottle =

Chinese powdered tobacco containers

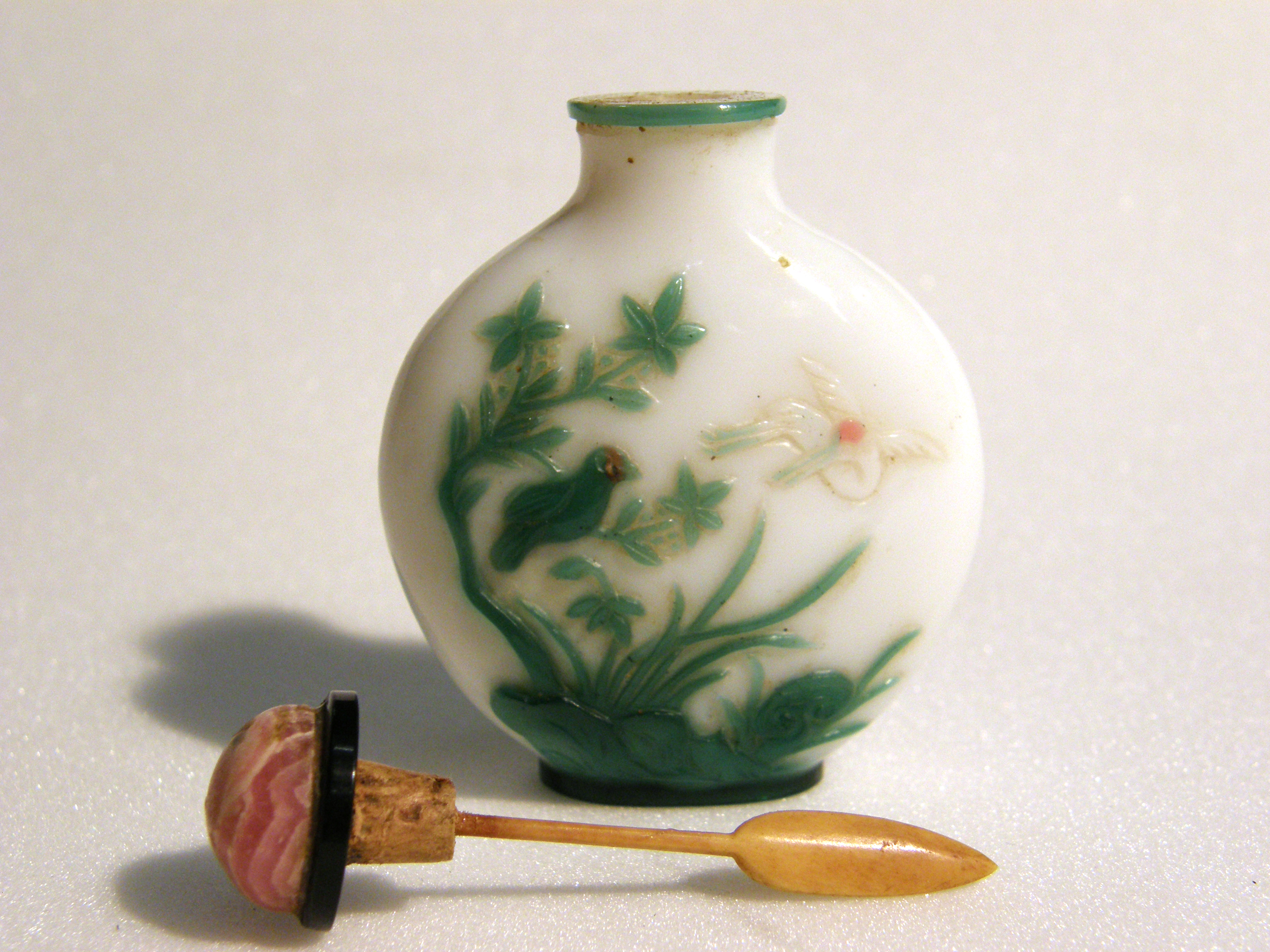
A glass snuff bottle with its stopper and spoon

After powdered tobacco (snuff) became popular in China around the 17th century, snuff bottles (Chinese: 鼻煙壺; pinyin: bíyānhú) became a common means of storing and transporting the substance for use in lieu of European snuff-boxes. Although pipe smoking (either through long bamboo pipes or brass water pipes) remained the predominant method of consuming tobacco following its introduction to China in the mid-1500s, snuff entered use by the mid-to-late 1600s, with the earliest written mentions and surviving examples of snuff bottles dating to the reign of the Kangxi Emperor of the Qing dynasty. Use was at first limited to Beijing, although gradually spread to other parts of the country by the 1800s; however, it was still firmly associated with the rich and powerful. Snuff bottles were constructed in a variety of shapes, designs, and materials, but all included a stopper and ivory-handled spoon. Usually small enough to be held in the hand, they could be fashioned from glass, porcelain, minerals (such as quartz crystal, jade, and gemstones), or organic materials such as amber, lacquer, coral, ivory (including the particularly valuable hornbill ivory), and tortoiseshell. Many bottles were fashioned into shapes scarcely resembling traditional bottles, including representational figures of humans and animals.

Snuff bottles were often richly decorated. Porcelain, glass, and enamel bottles were painted, either through overglaze and underglaze methods, while bottles made from natural materials were usually carved or engraved. Porcelain bottles were traditionally painted in blue and white, although European influence led to a large number of other colorful glazes and painting styles. During the late 1800s, inside-painted bottles emerged as a particularly intricate form of snuff bottle not intended for use; these were made with treated glass or crystal and feature elaborate scenes and designs painted along their inside through the neck of the bottle via special pens. By the early 1900s, snuff (alongside pipe smoking) fell out of fashion in China in favor of the newly-introduced cigarette.

== History ==
Tobacco use is first attested in China around the mid-1500s, as attested by clay tobacco pipes found in coastal Guangxi. This corresponds with the beginning of Spanish, Dutch, and Portuguese presence in China. Tobacco, originating in the Americas, entered China through several means; the primary route brought it to southern China via sea trade from Luzon and Taiwan. The late Ming dynasty attempted to ban the use of tobacco for unclear reasons, but following the Manchu conquest of China, the succeeding Qing dynasty made no attempts to ban or regulate tobacco consumption. During the 17th century, domestic tobacco cultivation and production had taken hold across the southern coast of China, as well as Manchuria. Smoking, either through long bamboo pipes or later brass water pipes, was among the most common methods of consuming tobacco. However, consumption of powdered tobacco—snuff—began to gain prominence in the mid-1600s, likely introduced by Jesuit missionaries.

Snuff, consumed through the nose, has been used in the Americas for millennia; it only gained popularity in Europe during the late 1500s. It was traditionally carried by Europeans in snuff-boxes. However, these failed to keep the snuff dry in wetter climates, and may have been cumbersome to carry in clothing without pockets. As such, Chinese snuff users began to carry it in small sealed bottles. Restricted at first to the very wealthy, especially among the imperial court, it is unknown when snuff bottles were first created. A small group of bronze bottles dated to 1644–1653 (during the reign of the Shunzhi Emperor) is attested, but it is unknown if these are authentic or later forgeries. Snuff was generally imported in large glass storage jars, but these would have been very inconvenient for everyday use. Domestic snuff production began by the end of the century in Yanzhou, Shandong; however, this was generally judged to be inferior to imported snuff by the Qing court, especially in comparison to the Brazilian amostrinha.

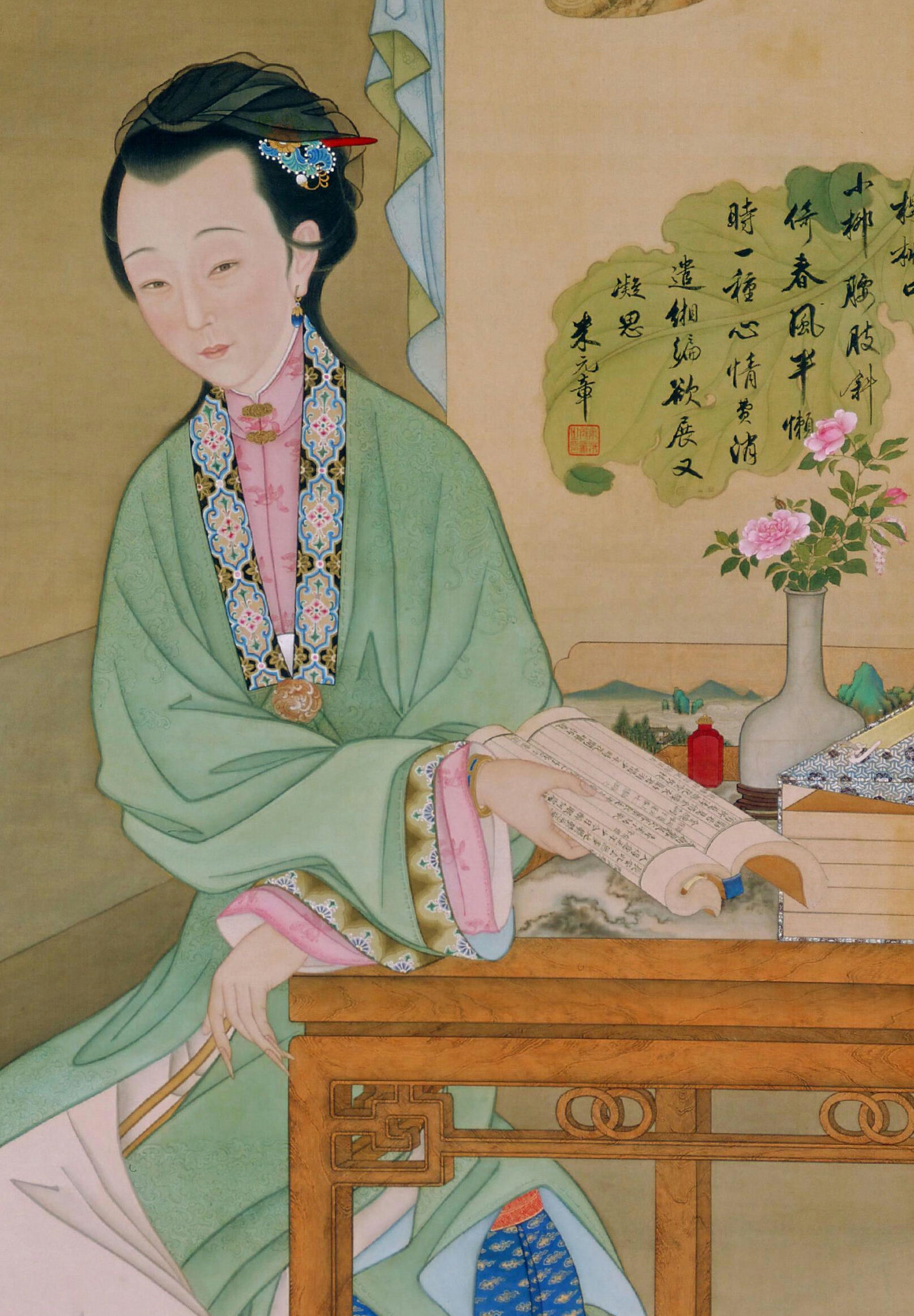
A painting from the 18th century series Twelve Concubines of the Yongzheng Emperor depicts a red glass snuff bottle.

The first reliable evidence of snuff bottles dates to the reign of the Kangxi Emperor in the late 1600s and early 1700s. In 1684, the emperor received gifts, including snuff, from a delegation of two Jesuit missionaries; Kangxi had all the gifts except the snuff returned. Kangxi ordered the creation of an imperial glassworks to produce snuff bottles in 1693, which opened three years later under the direction of the Jesuit Kilian Stumpf. A 1702 passage by the poet and minister Wang Shizhen is the earliest attested mention of snuff bottles:

Recently in the capital snuff has been produced. It is said to improve one's sight, especially to exorcise epidemic diseases. The snuff is put in glass bottles which are of varying shapes, in colors red, purple, yellow, white, black, green, and brown. The white is clear as crystal and the red like fire. What lovely things they are! The spoon is made of ivory, used to extract the snuff out of the bottle to be inhaled, and then put back in the bottle. The snuff bottles are manufactured by the imperial court. Snuff bottles are also imitated among the people, but are far inferior in quality and design.

— Wang Shizhen, Xiangzu biji, 1702

European missionaries were strongly tied to the early production of snuff bottles at the imperial glassworks. They were joined by native Chinese glassmakers, many from the glassmaking centers of Guangzhou and Boshan. European presence at the glassworks declined, and by 1760 it was entirely in the hands of domestic glassmakers. Mastery of glassmaking technology fell into some decline due to the lack of Jesuit glassmakers, but this was supplanted by a rise in lapidary and engraving technology which contributed to a steady output of high-quality snuff bottles by the imperial court into the mid-1800s. Court artisans produced snuff bottles out of both glass and hardstone such as jade. The Palace Workshops in Beijing are known to have manufactured both snuff and snuff bottles, and the Guangzhou Imperial Workshops likely began production of both around the same time. The Beijing palace glassworks declined during the late 18th century, and by 1829 had largely ceased production. The branch glassworks at the Old Summer Palace in Chengde, to the north of Beijing, was quite active throughout this period, and may have operated until 1860 when the palace was destroyed in the Second Opium War.

The missionary Jean Joseph Marie Amiot wrote in 1774 that snuff use was still mainly limited to Beijing. Snuffing slowly spread outside the ranks of court officials into other classes, but remained a practice firmly associated with wealth. In 1802, Jiqing, the Viceroy of Liangguang, committed suicide by swallowing a snuff bottle.

Cigarettes became a common form of tobacco use in China in the early 20th century. Although pipe smoking and snuff had great cultural prestige, cigarettes were cheap and quick, and other forms of tobacco consumption began to be seen as old-fashioned.

== Design ==
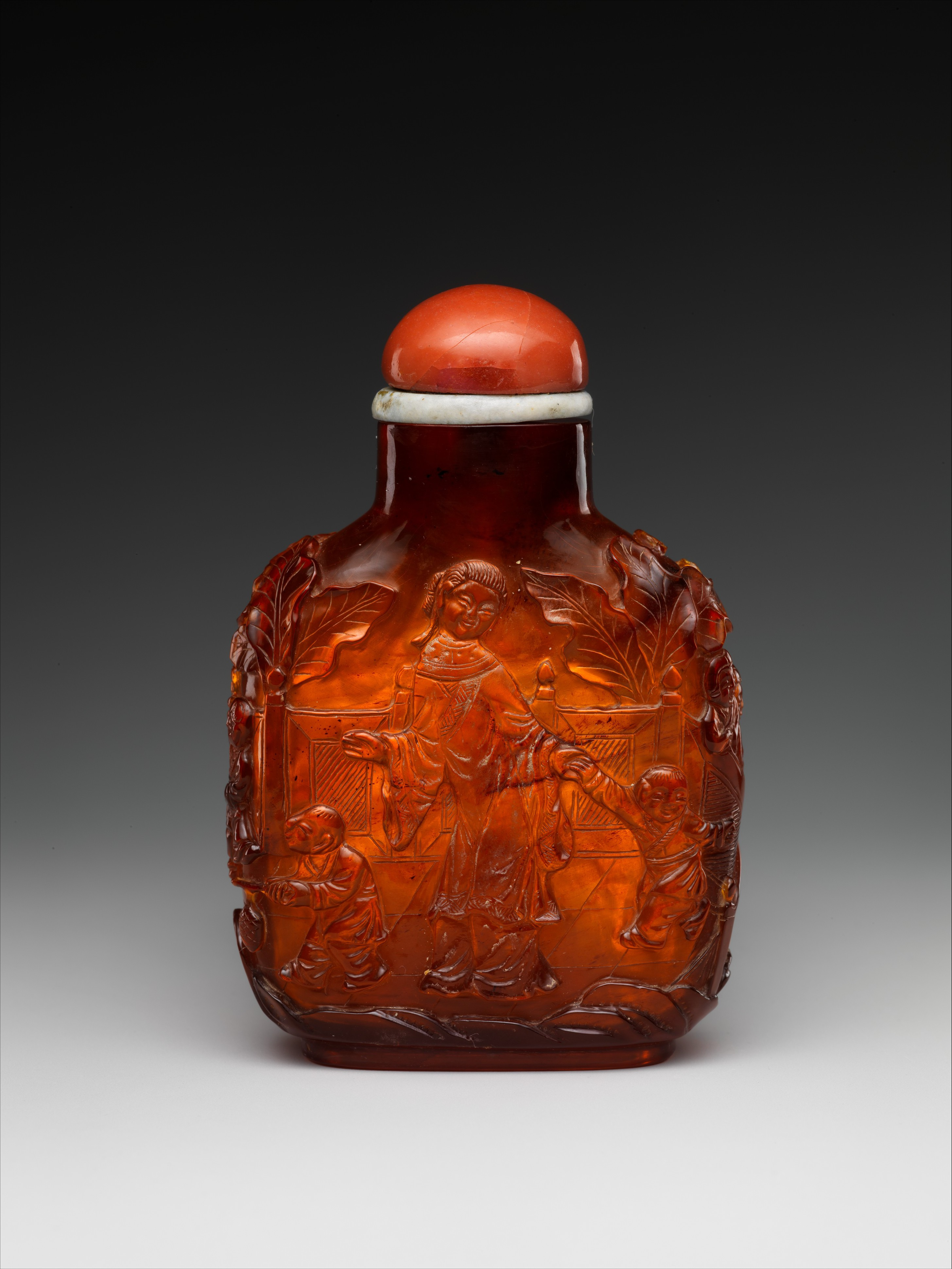
A 19th century amber snuff bottle, featuring a coral stopper and a design showing a woman and children in a garden

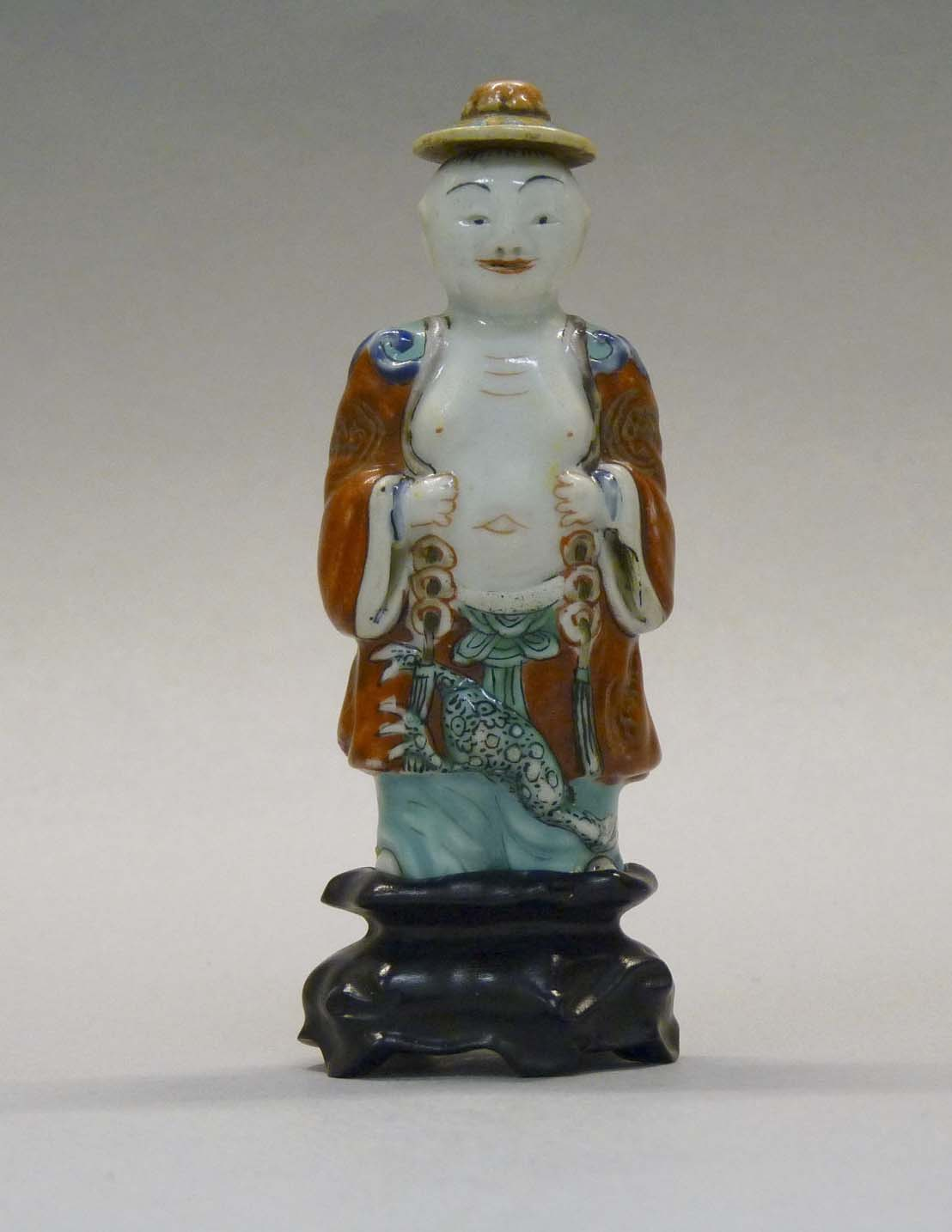
A porcelain snuff bottle carved into the shape of a man; the figure's hat is used as the stopper.

Snuff bottles were produced in a variety of shapes and materials, many bearing little resemblance to a traditional bottle. They could be round, ovoid, cylindrical (either with a straight or rounded top), quadrangular, or spade-shaped. Others are more representational in their shape; some are shaped like people, animals, or fruits such as melon or Buddha's hand. The bottles are usually small enough to be comfortably held in the hand, although some examples are much larger and were likely used to store snuff for use at home.

Each bottle featured a stopper—only rarely surviving to the present—and a tiny spoon was used to extract the snuff from the bottle and onto the back of the user's hand. Stoppers were often topped with a hemispheric layer (often made of a precious or semi-precious material). These are themselves often topped with a finial, usually of a different color. At the base of the stoppers are a small collar and a cork from which suspends the spoon via a tenon. The spoon handles were generally made of ivory, horn, or metal, although other materials were also occasionally used.

Many snuff bottles feature reign marks painted on their bottoms, ostensibly marking the emperor under whose reign the bottle was made. Reign marks can take the form of standard Chinese characters or the older seal script. Such marks cannot be used as accurate indicators for the date of creation, as artists often dated their work to the reign of a previous emperor; the reign of the Qianlong Emperor, when snuff bottles first reached wider popularity, was particularly common to attribute later works to. Snuff bottles featuring the reign mark of the earlier Kangxi Emperor are extremely rare.

Snuff bottles were often placed on decorative stands which allowed the bottle to sit upright. Some stands were made specifically for their bottle, shaped to hold them properly and to serve as a decorative complement. The bottles were often transported in small boxes or fabric bags. Snuff bottle boxes had a hardwood exterior and a silk-lined padded interior. These had cavities cut into the interior to snugly hold the bottle (and sometimes its stand). These boxes could be opened and placed in an upright position to display the bottle.

Concave snuff saucers or dishes were often included alongside bottles, sometimes with a complementary material or design. Snuff would be emptied onto the saucers before use and crushed to smooth out the small lumps which would naturally form.

=== Materials ===
Glass and porcelain are the most common materials for snuff bottles. Porcelain bottles lend themselves to being made in a variety of shapes and sizes, from cylinders to complicated figure molds. Glass is more fragile than porcelain, so fewer antique examples have survived. Glass bottles range from simple single-color designs to imitations of hardstone bottles; such imitations can be remarkably accurate, and can only be identified through the presence of microscopic bubbles or scratch tests. Some glass bottles, known as glass-overlay bottles, featured a design made of a thin layer of glass superimposed atop a bottle of a contrasting color. Enamel, metal, and cloisonné (enameled metal) bottles were also produced.

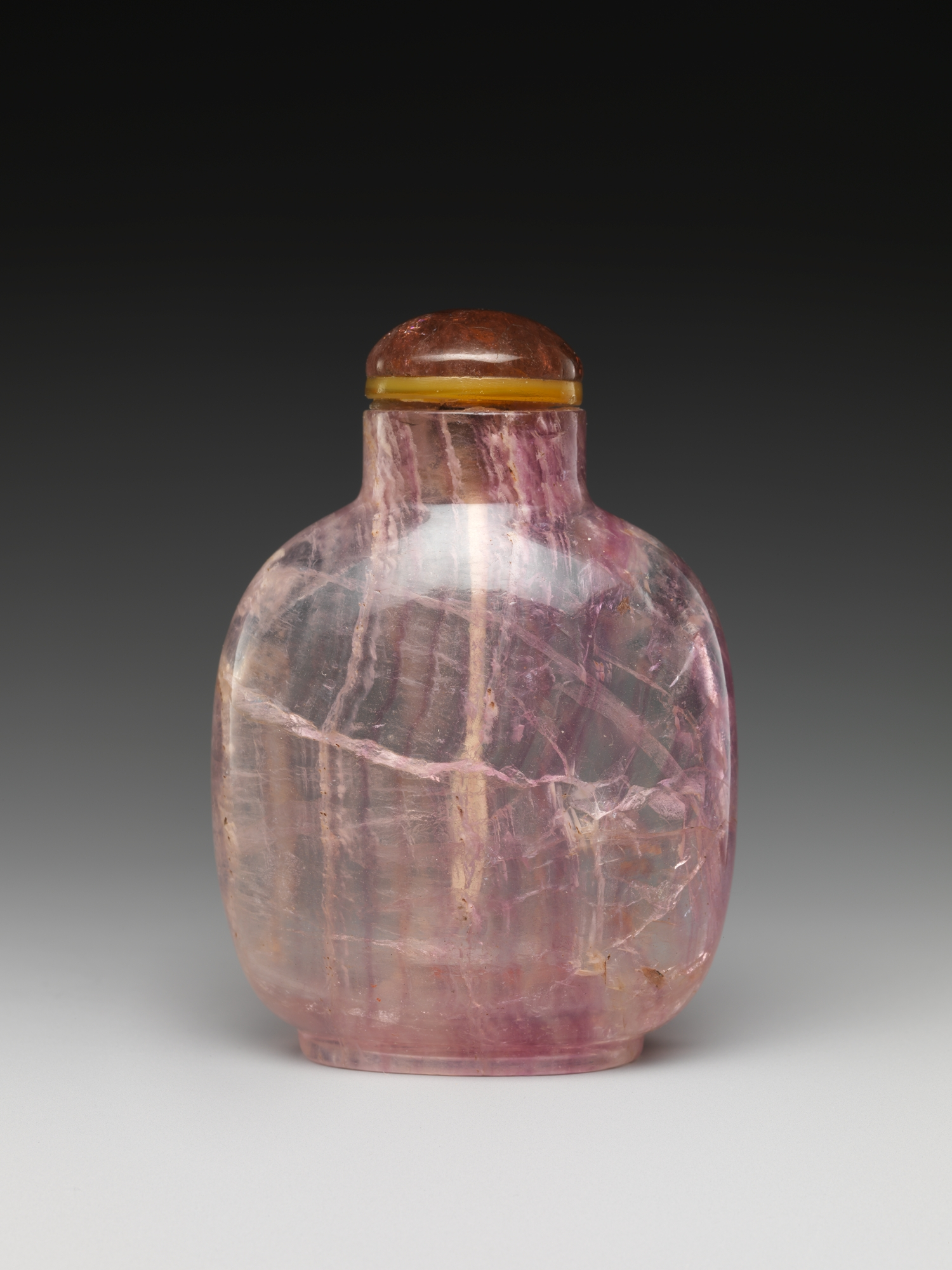
An amethyst snuff bottle, c. 1800

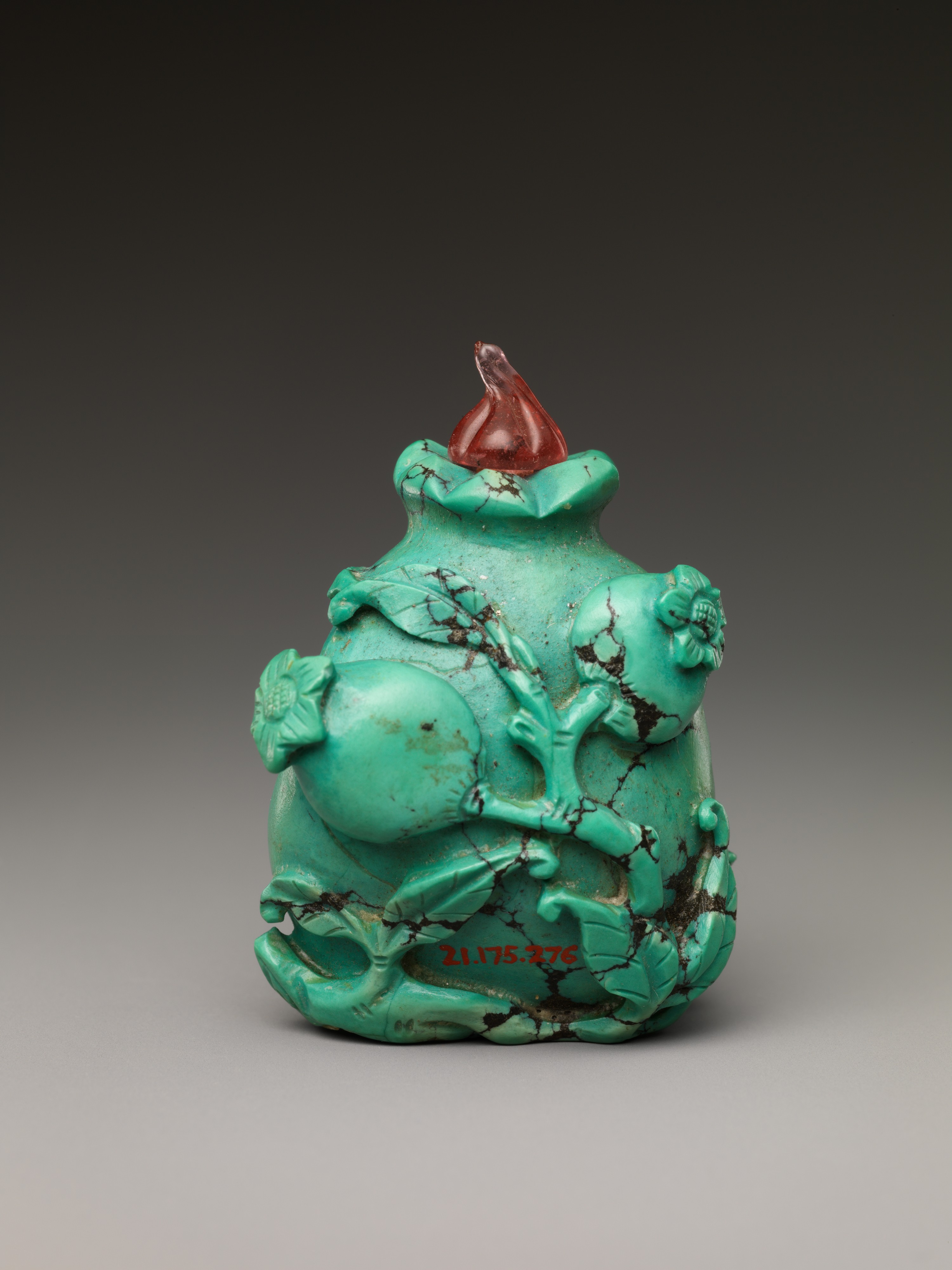
A turquoise snuff bottle with a rose motif and a pink glass stopper

Hardstone snuff bottles were popular, but extremely difficult to produce. Workshops specializing in hardstone crafts required professional craftsmen, with each artisan often specialized in a specific stage of production. Workshops themselves would often specialize in a particular kind of rock, such as jade or agate. Common materials include jade (a particularly common choice), chalcedony, and quartz. Quartz was chosen for the rich colors often found in the rock. Some quartz bottles were made with a cameo technique, where an artist would carve away the top layer of the rock to reveal the color of another layer beneath. A particularly dramatic form of hardstone bottle incorporated agates cut in such a way that a design forms from the inclusions formed within the rock. Less common hardstones used for snuff bottles include nephrite, malachite, serpentine, limestone, and puddingstone. Gemstones and other semi-precious minerals were also occasionally used; lapis lazuli, beryl, and sapphire were produced, as were extremely rare ruby bottles.

Some snuff bottles were made from organic materials. Ivory was common, but other examples were fashioned from materials such as amber, coral, bamboo, mother-of-pearl, horn (such as rhinoceros), tortoiseshell, dried tangerine peel, fossil rock, coconut and wood. Snuff bottles made from hornbill ivory, taken from the beak of the helmeted hornbill, are particularly rare and valuable. Cinnabar lacquer, made from cinnabar and the Japanese lacquer tree, was used to construct some bottles. These were produced by applying successive layers of lacquer to a wooden base, and generally featured lacquer stoppers.

=== Decoration ===
Snuff bottle designs were generally made through carving, engraving, or painting. Painting was done both overglaze and underglaze on porcelain, glass, and enamel bottles, while engraving and carving were primarily done on rock and organic materials. Designs featured on the bottles were generally representational figures rather than abstract. Common motifs included landscapes, everyday objects, plants, and animals both real and mythical (especially horses, deer, dragons, guardian lions, and fenghuang). Humans and deities were also common, including cultural figures such as the Eight Immortals and the Seven Sages of the Bamboo Grove.

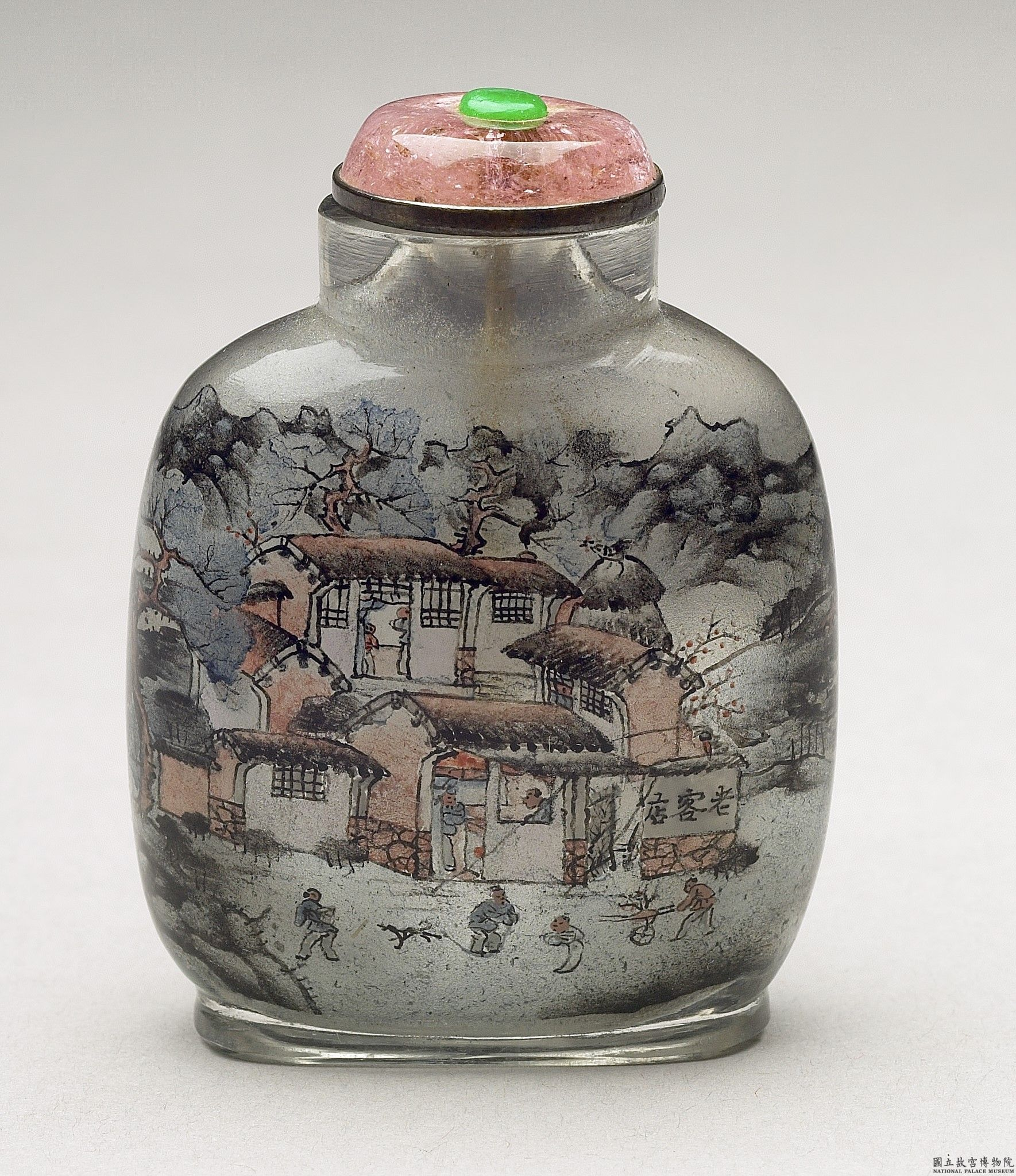
An inside-painted snuff bottle from the Guangxu reign (1875–1908), featuring a travel scene

Porcelain bottles are often painted in blue and white, a traditional color scheme of many Chinese ceramics. These can feature both overglaze and underglaze decorations. Sometimes, additional colors (most commonly copper-red and green) were painted onto the bottles after glazing. Due to western influence in the early 1700s, famille rose ceramics, featuring pinkish colors, became popular in China. By the middle of the century, snuff bottle artists had begun to adapt traditional blue-and-white designs to incorporate more color. Colorful glazes such as sang de boeuf glaze, robin egg blue glaze, and clair de lune glaze were also introduced during this period.

Some quartz crystal snuff bottles included flattened front and back surfaces, on which were carved the design of a western coin—often a Spanish colonial coin. These "coin-bottles" sometimes feature a legend (the text along the rim of the coin) carved in a mirrored direction.

Inside-painted snuff bottles, an innovation of the late 1800s, featured intricate designs on their interior. Generally made from glass or quartz crystal (although a variety of materials, including amber are attested) the interiors of the bottles were treated with a dilute acid and then painted with long wooden pens featuring bent tips. Most were not intended to actually carry snuff, as such use would slowly rub away the designs painted inside. These bottles were extremely difficult to produce, requiring years of apprenticeship in order to paint the designs backwards and through the neck of the bottle. These bottles often feature a date and the artist's signature.

== Collecting ==
Snuff bottle collecting gained popularity in the United States and Europe during the 20th century. Although mainland Chinese collectors became the dominant buyers in most fields of Chinese art collecting by the 2010s, Western interest in snuff bottles remained relatively competitive. They are sold by various prominent auction houses, as well as a network of North American dealers vetted by the International Chinese Snuff Bottle Society. Bottles from imperial workshops are especially popular; Qianlong-era bottles are particularly sought-after, with one example selling for HK$4,459,162 (US$638,242) at a Bonhams Hong Kong auction in 2012.
