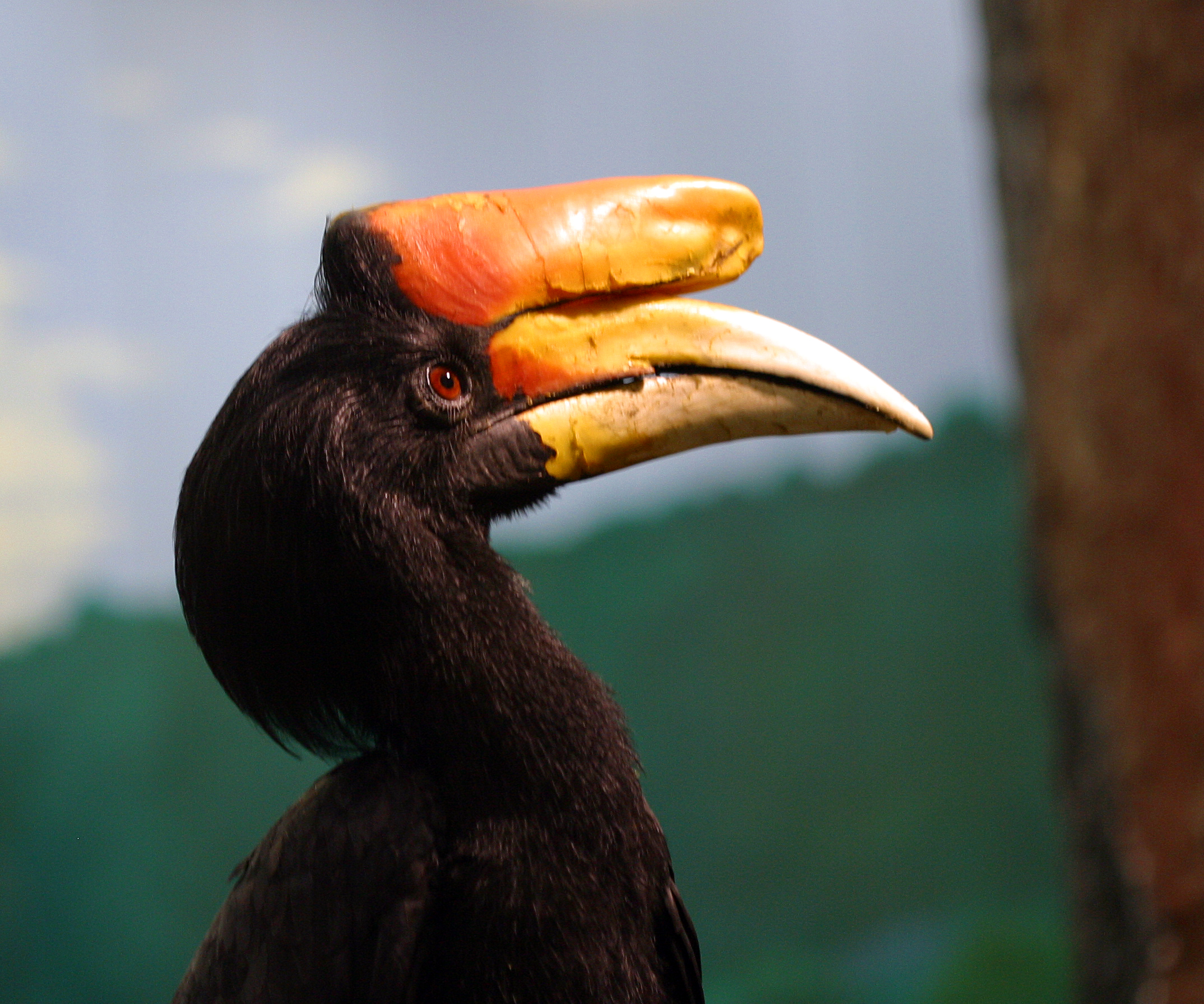
- Rhinoceros hornbill Buceros rhinoceros

Scientific classification
- Kingdom: Animalia
- Phylum: Chordata
- Class: Aves
- Order: Bucerotiformes
- Family: Bucerotidae
- Genus: Buceros; Linnaeus, 1758

Type species
- Buceros rhinoceros (rhinoceros hornbill) Linnaeus, 1758

Species
- See text.

Synonyms
- Hydrocorax Brisson, 1760

= Buceros =

Genus of birds

Buceros, from Ancient Greek βοῦς (boûs), meaning "ox", and κέρας (kéras), meaning "horn", is a genus of large Asian hornbills (family Bucerotidae).

== Description ==
Hornbills in the genus Buceros include some of the largest arboreal hornbills in the world, the largest of which is the great hornbill. All the hornbills in this genus have a large and hollow bony casque on their upper beak that can be useful to scientists and bird watchers to recognise their age, sex and species. Their wingspan can be up to 1.8 meters (6 foot) and they have the largest wingspan out of all the hornbills.

== Taxonomy ==
The genus Buceros was introduced in 1758 by the Swedish naturalist Carl Linnaeus in the tenth edition of his Systema Naturae. The name comes from Ancient Greek βοῦς (boûs), meaning "ox", and κέρας (kéras), meaning "horn". The type species was designated as the rhinoceros hornbill (Buceros rhinoceros) by Daniel Giraud Elliot in 1882.

=== Species ===
The genus contains three species:

Genus Buceros – Linnaeus, 1758 – three species
Common name	Scientific name and subspecies	Range	Size and ecology	IUCN status and estimated population
Rhinoceros hornbill	Buceros rhinoceros Linnaeus, 1758 Three subspecies: B. r. borneoensis Schlegel & Müller, S, 1845 – Borneo; B. r. rhinoceros Linnaeus, 1758 – south Malay Peninsula and Sumatra; B. r. silvestris Vieillot, 1816 – Java	Borneo, Sumatra, Java, the Malay Peninsula, Singapore, and southern Thailand	Size: Habitat: Diet:	VU
Great hornbill	Buceros bicornis Linnaeus, 1758	India, Bhutan, Nepal, Mainland Southeast Asia, Indonesian Island of Sumatra and North eastern region of India	Size: Habitat: Diet:	VU
Rufous hornbill	Buceros hydrocorax Linnaeus, 1756 Three subspecies: B. h. hydrocorax: Luzon and Marinduque; B. h. semigaelatus:Samar, Leyte, Bohol, Panaon, Biliran, Calicoan and Buad; B. h. mindanensis: Dinagat, Siargao, Mindanao	Philippines	Size: Habitat: Diet:	VU

The helmeted hornbill is sometimes included in this genus, but today most authorities place it in the monotypic Rhinoplax instead.
