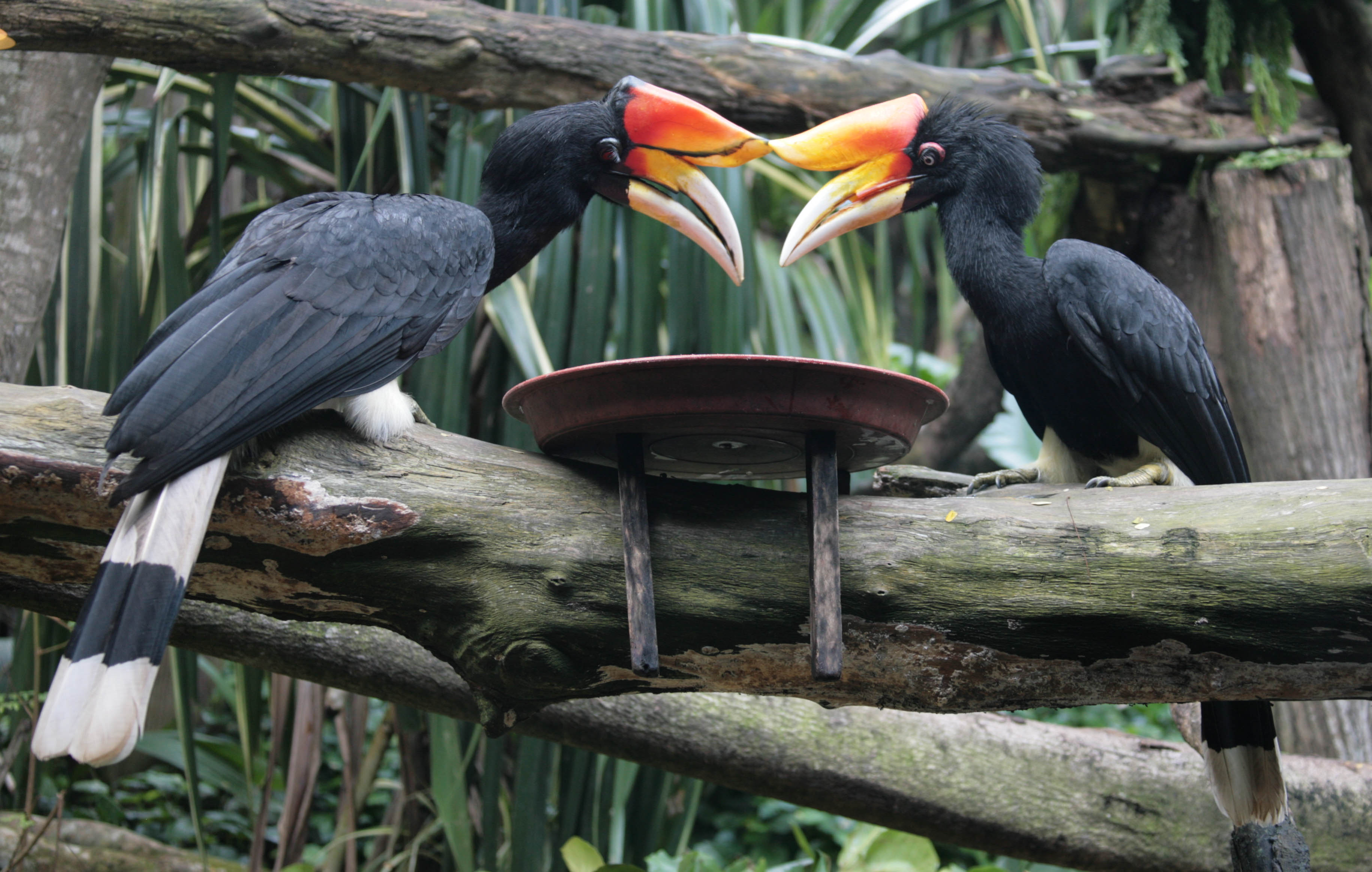
- A pair in Singapore Zoo

Conservation status
- Vulnerable (IUCN 3.1)
- CITES Appendix II

Scientific classification
- Kingdom: Animalia
- Phylum: Chordata
- Class: Aves
- Order: Bucerotiformes
- Family: Bucerotidae
- Genus: Buceros
- Species: B. rhinoceros

Binomial name
- Buceros rhinoceros Linnaeus, 1758

= Rhinoceros hornbill =

Species of bird

The rhinoceros hornbill (Buceros rhinoceros) is a large species of forest hornbill. In captivity, it can live for up to 35 years. It is found in lowland and montane, tropical and subtropical climates and in mountain rain forests up to 1,400 metres in the Malay Peninsula from southern Thailand; and the islands of Singapore, Borneo, Sumatra and Java.

The rhinoceros hornbill is the state bird of the Malaysian state of Sarawak and the country's national bird. It is scheduled as a "totally protected animal" under Sarawak law through the 1998 Wild Life Protection Ordinance.

== Taxonomy ==
The rhinoceros hornbill was formally described by the Swedish naturalist Carl Linnaeus in 1758 in the tenth edition of his Systema Naturae. He placed it with the great hornbill in the genus Buceros and coined the binomial name Buceros rhinoceros, where he specified the location as India. The genus name comes from Ancient Greek βοῦς boûs meaning "ox", and κέρας kéras meaning "horn"; the species epithet rhinoceros comes from how the species' bill resembles a rhinoceros' horn.

Three subspecies are recognised:

- B. r. borneoensis Schlegel & Müller, S, 1845 – Borneo
- B. r. rhinoceros Linnaeus, 1758 – south Malay Peninsula and Sumatra
- B. r. silvestris Vieillot, 1816 – Java

== Description ==
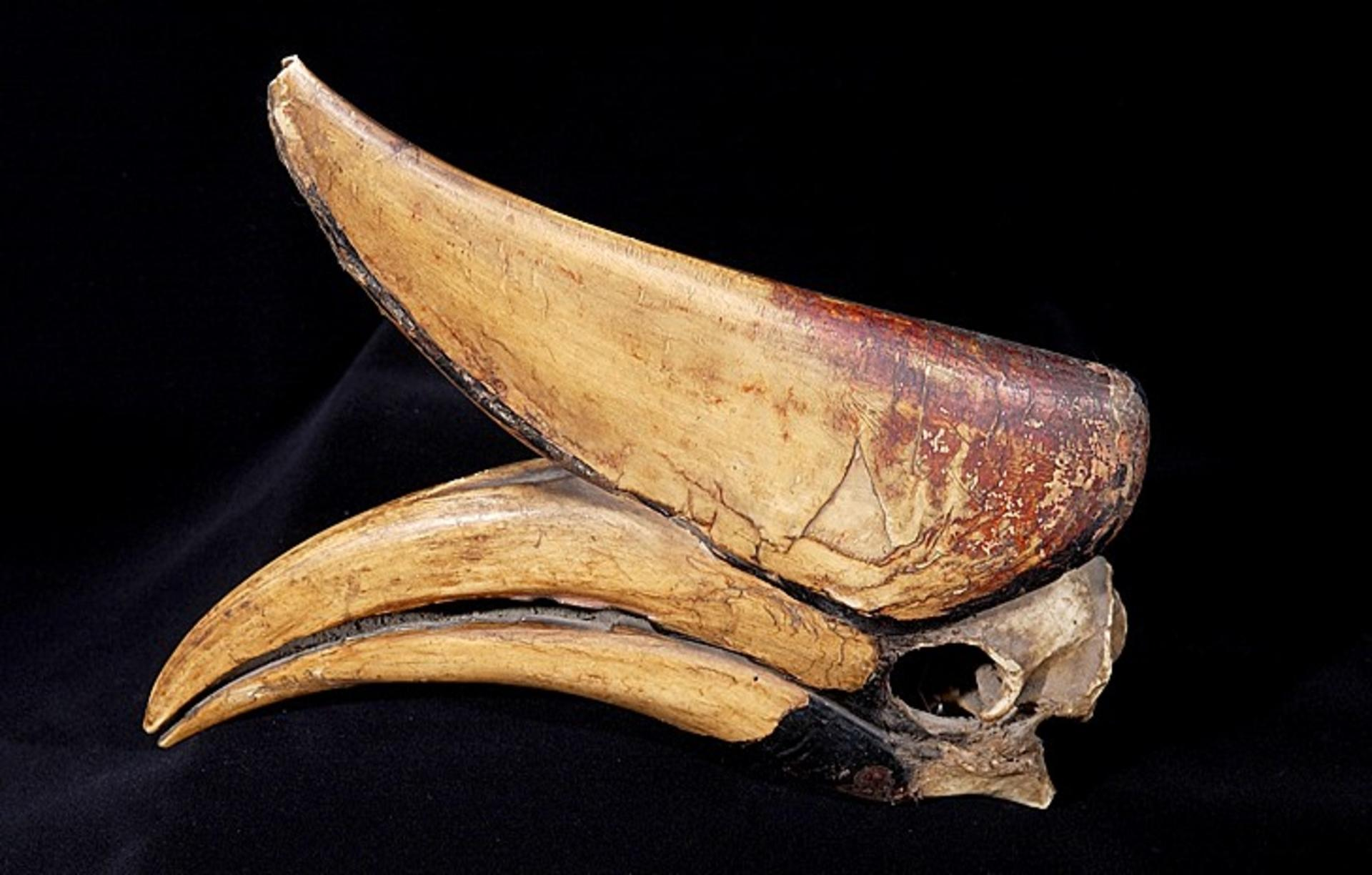
The skull of B. r. silvestris

The rhinoceros hornbill is a large arboreal hornbill, 80 to 90 cm (31–35 in) long. The weight varies by sex, with males weighing around 2,465 to 2,960 g (87.0–104.4 oz) and the females 2,040 to 2,330 g (72–82 oz). The plumage is predominantly black, with white legs and vent and a white tail with a black band. The huge bill and casque are orange and red, the colour coming from preen oil rubbed on from the preen gland above the tail. The eyes of the male are red with black rims, and white with red rims in the female.

== Behaviour ==
=== Diet and feeding ===
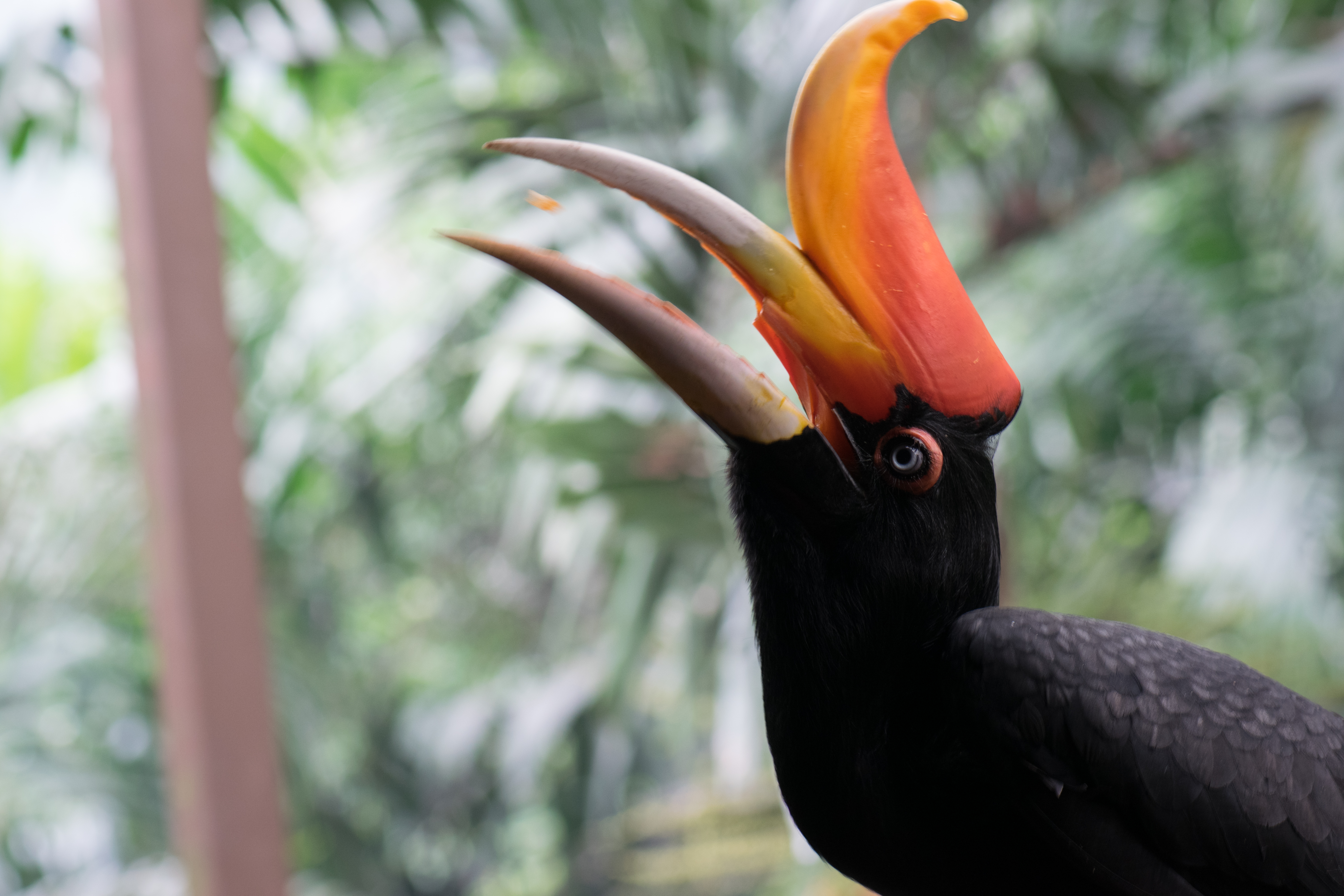
A female eating a peanut

The diet of the rhinoceros hornbill is dominated by fruit, but it will take any insect, small reptile, rodent, and smaller birds that it can catch.

=== Breeding ===
The courtship and bonding of these birds are critical, as the female must trust the male to provide her with everything when she is incubating and raising chicks. These hornbills make their nests inside tree trunks, and the female stays inside with the eggs and then with the chicks, while the male brings them food. After the eggs are laid, the male collects mud, and the pair pack that mud, along with food and feces, to wall up the entrance to the tree cavity. They leave a very small hole, just large enough for the male to feed the female, and later the chicks, and for the female to defecate through the hole. Once the chicks are fully feathered and old enough to leave the nest, the parents chip away the dry mud to let the chicks out.

There has been recording interbreeding between the rhinoceros hornbill and the great hornbill, with successful raising of the chicks.

== Status and conservation ==
The rhinoceros hornbill faces a number of threats, including loss of its rainforest habitat, as well as hunting for its meat, and its skull and feathers. Habitat destruction has led to the loss of the large trees the species requires for breeding, which in turn makes it easier for poachers to find the rhinoceros hornbill. It is frequently shot at by poachers due to confusion with the highly sought-after helmeted hornbill. Due to this, the species was uplisted to vulnerable from near threatened on the IUCN Red List in 2018.

== Cultural significance ==
Some Dayak people, especially the Ibanic groups, believe it to be the chief of worldly birds or the supreme worldly bird, and its statue is used to welcome the god of the augural birds, Sengalang Burong, to the feasts and celebrations of humankind. Contrary to some misunderstandings, the rhinoceros hornbill does not represent their war god, who is represented in this world by the brahminy kite.

It is featured on the reverse of the 5 Malaysian ringgit bill.

== Gallery ==
rhinoceros hornbill call

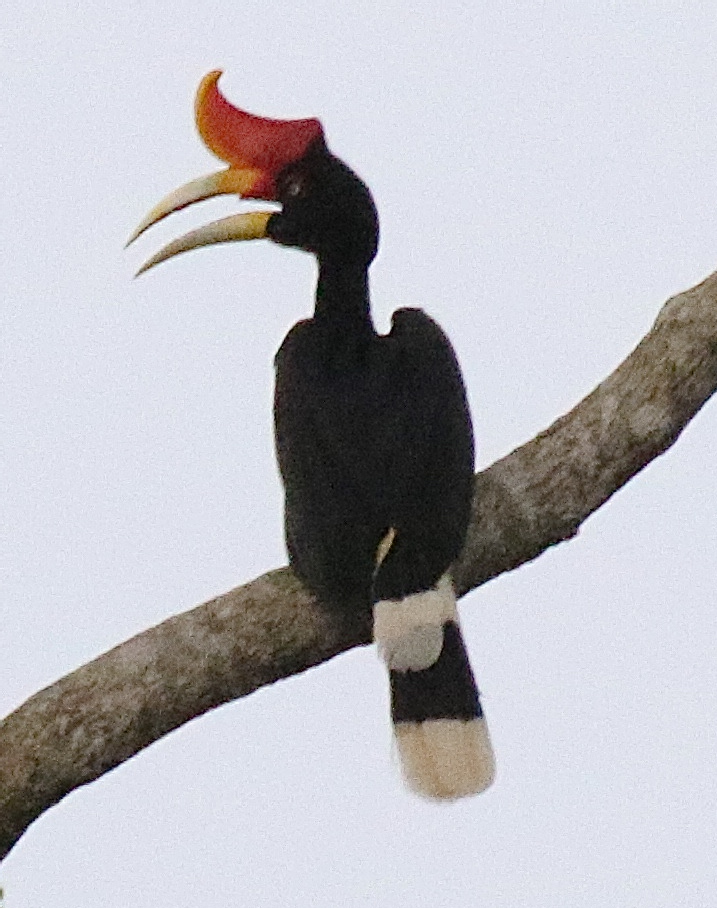
Sepilok Nature Resort - Sabah, Borneo - Malaysia

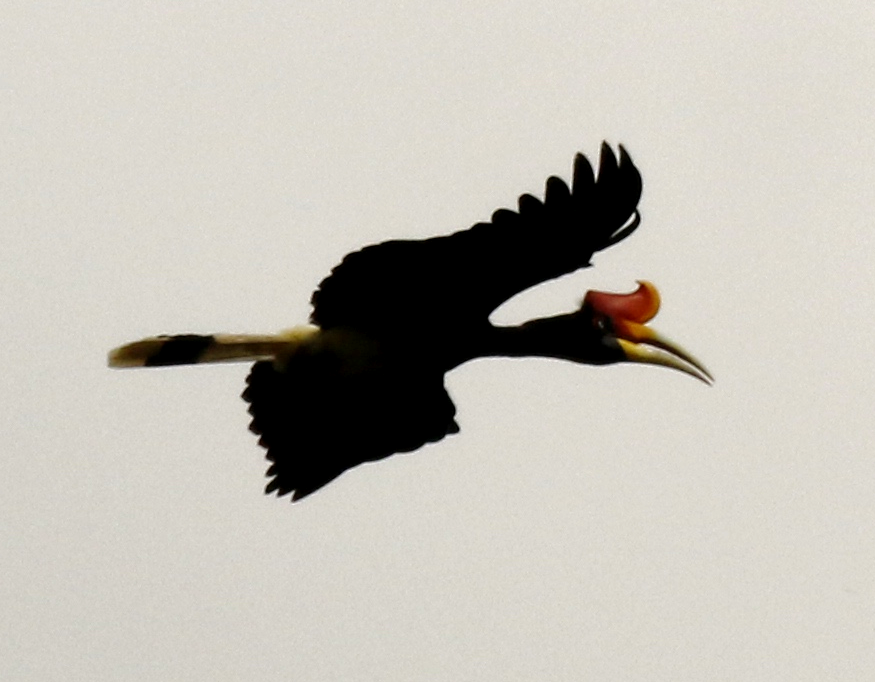
Borneo Rainforest Lodge - Danum Valley, Sabah, Borneo - Malaysia

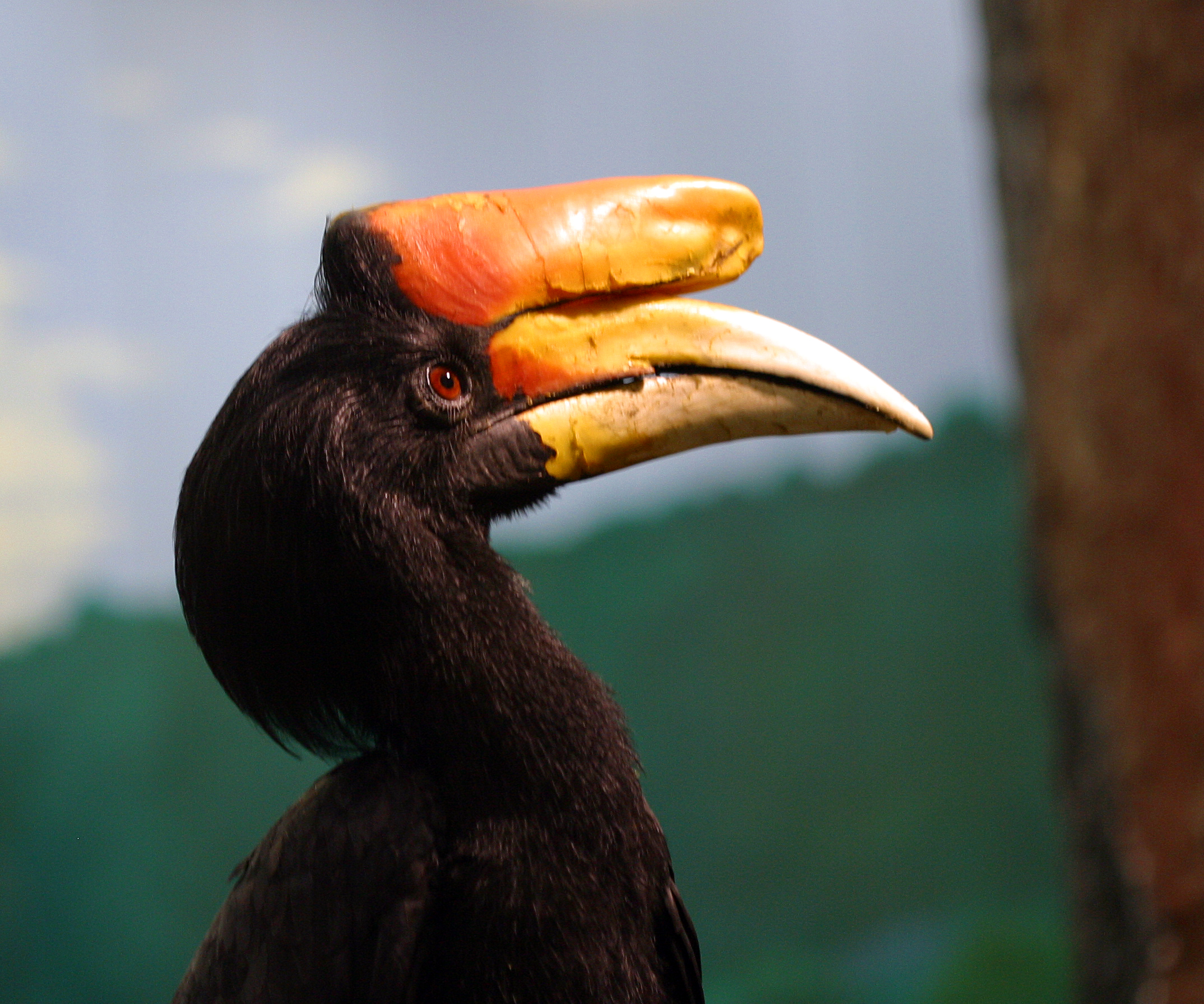
Male at the National Aviary, Pittsburgh. Males have red irises.

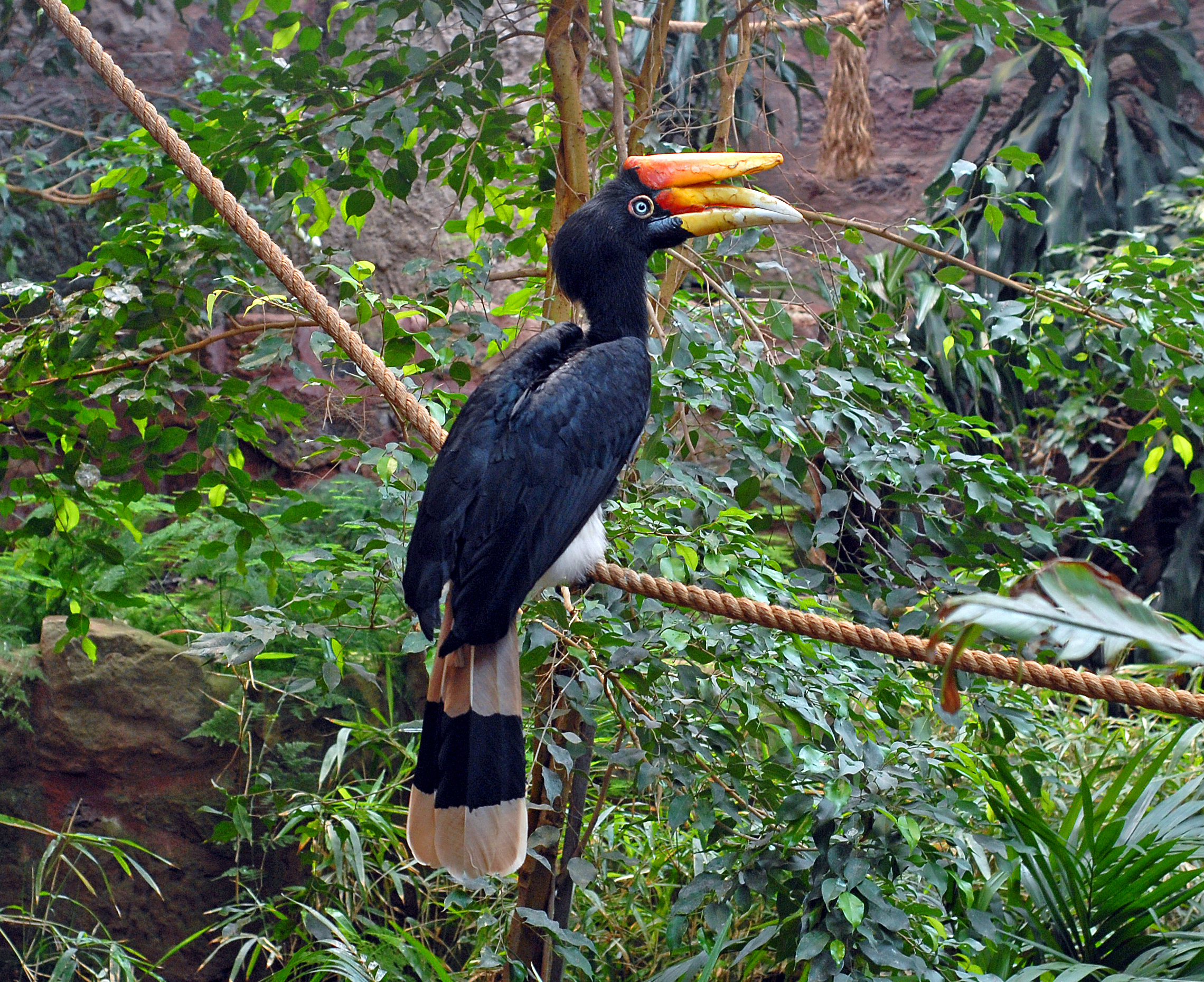
Female at Chester Zoo, England

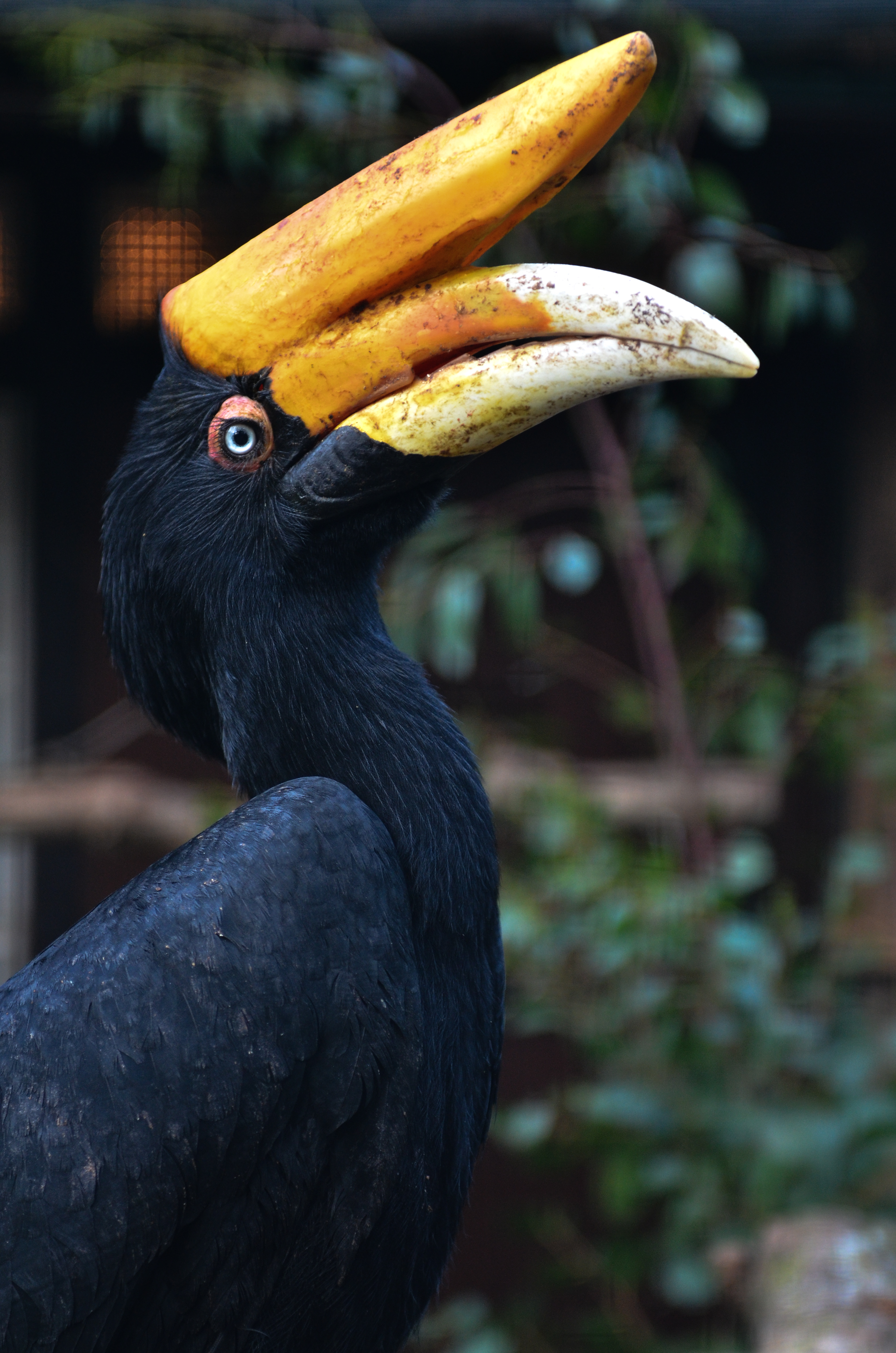
Buceros rhinoceros silvestris at Weltvogelpark Walsrode, Germany

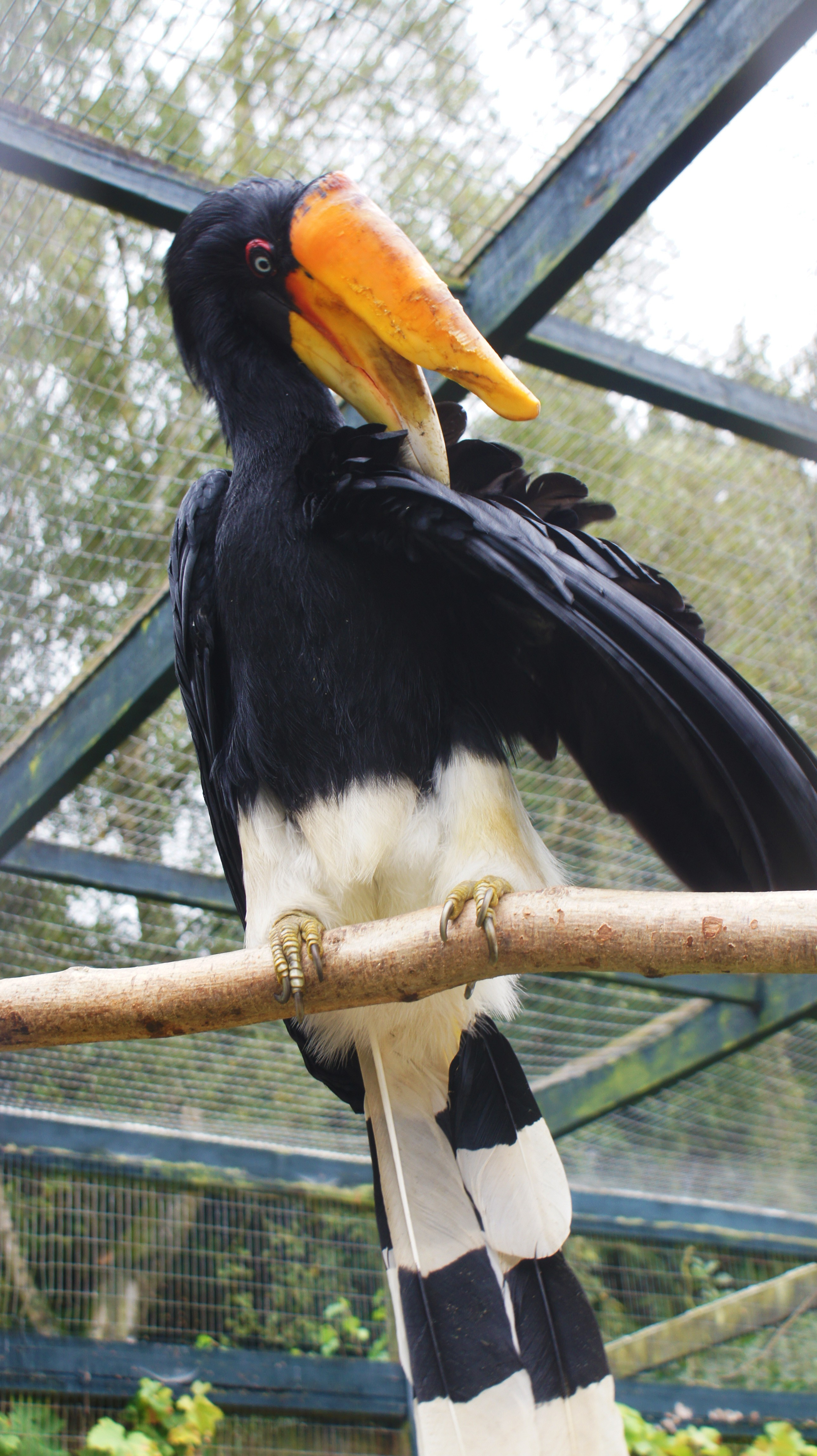
Female at Birdworld, England
