= Inner painting =

Chinese art form

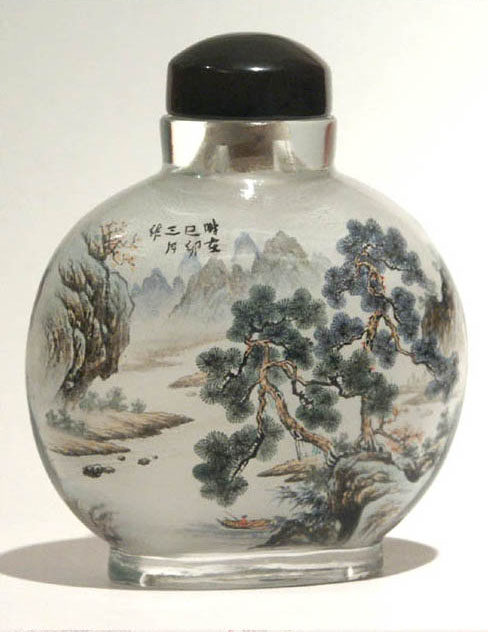
Modern inside-painted bottle

Inner painting (simplified Chinese: 内画; traditional Chinese: 內畫; pinyin: nèihuà), also known as inner drawing or inside painted, is a Chinese art form. It involves glass bottles which have pictures and often calligraphy painted on the inside surface of the glass. The bottles are produced by manipulating a specialized paint brush through the neck of the bottle.

Inside-painted bottles are associated with Chinese snuff bottles. The earliest inside painted bottles are thought to have been made in the period between 1820 and 1830 as, by then, the beauty of a snuff bottle was probably more important than utilitarian considerations—and considering this—few would have been used for holding snuff.

To paint the inside of the bottle, the artist must paint backwards. Concentration is crucial to make precise strokes. A skilled artist may complete a simple bottle in a week while something special may take a month or more. The best craftsmen may produce only a few bottles in a year.

== See also ==
- Impossible bottle
