= Hornbill ivory =

Material derived from hornbill's beak

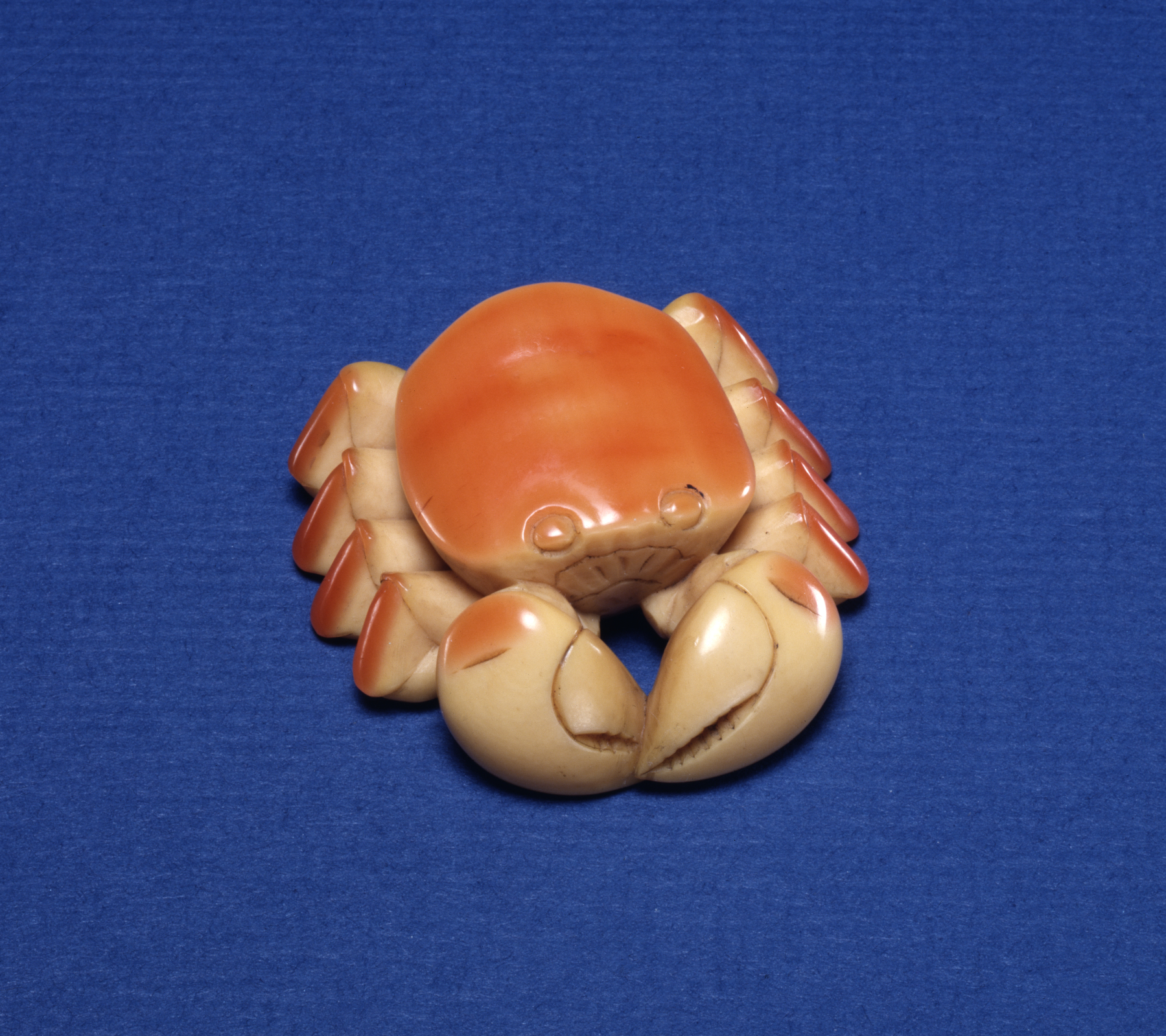
19th-century Japanese belt ornament in hornbill ivory, showing natural preen gland colouring

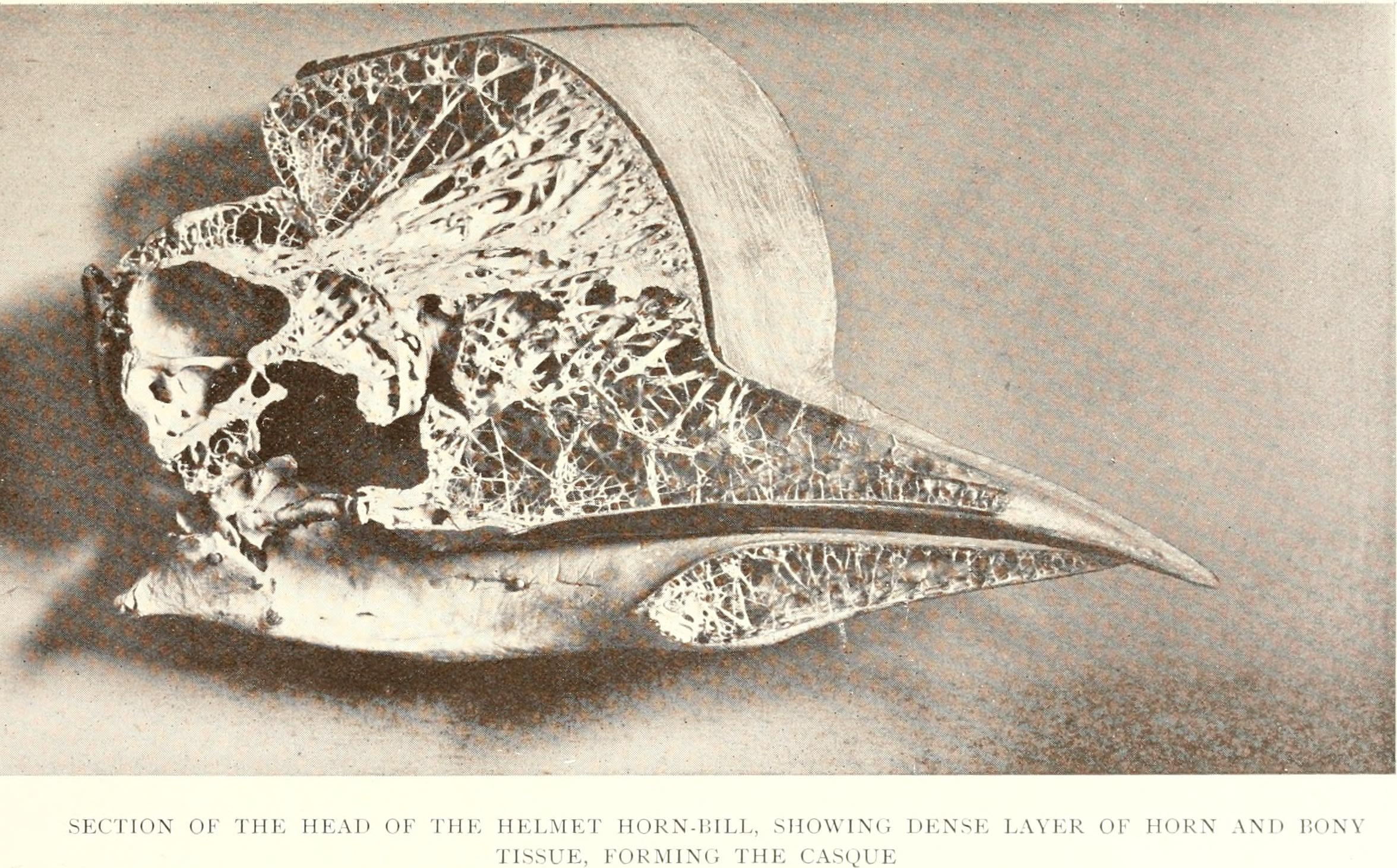
Cross-section of helmeted hornbill head, showing dense bony layer of the casque, harvested for hornbill ivory

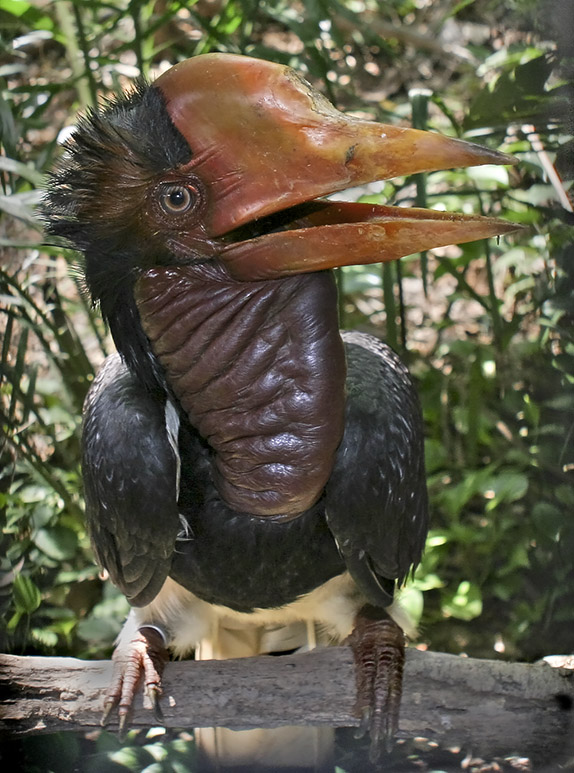
Helmeted hornbill (Rhinoplax vigil)

Hornbill ivory (also called golden jade or calao ivory, and ivoire rouge in French) is a precious ornamental material derived from the helmeted hornbill (Rhinoplax vigil), a large bird of the Malay Peninsula, Sumatra, and Borneo.

Many hornbill species have "casques", decorative growths on the upper mandible of the bill. In most, the casque has a spongy structure, but in the helmeted hornbill it is solid keratin. This material, hornbill ivory, has a texture suggesting ivory but is softer. As it grows it is golden yellow, but the bird rubs its casque on its preen gland, whose oily secretion tints the surface of the casque bright red.

Native peoples in the helmeted hornbill's range, such as the Kenyah and Kelabit, have long carved the casques. In Malaysia, hornbill-ivory rings were said to change colour when near poisonous food. The Chinese encountered the material in the 14th century and it soon became an important trade item at Brunei. According to Tom Harrisson, writing in the first (1960) edition of The Birds of Borneo:

It is likely that the casques were mainly exported raw, and worked with a heat treatment and pressing—of which no detailed description survives—in China, to preserve and heighten the lovely deep golden and surface red patina of the fresh ivory. The Chinese probably got the idea of using ho-ting from the Dayaks, then improved the technique at their end. The uses of hornbill casques in Borneo are various and frequently effective; we will discuss those presently. While the Borneo usages persist to this day, all trace of the art of the Chinese carver seems to have vanished. Very little has survived of a remarkable craft which undoubtedly paid for many of the old jars, plates, and beads still decorating the longhouses or wives of better-off Bornean pagans many generations later.

During the Ming dynasty, the Chinese valued hornbill ivory above true ivory or jade. They carved the casques, or made them into sheets, coloured them with the secretion of the preen gland, and made them into belt buckles for high officials. They called hornbill ivory hèdǐng (Wade–Giles ho-ting), which is said to be their approximation of an indigenous name (but means "crane head", and thus many Chinese thought the substance came from a crane rather than a hornbill). The Japanese also carved imported hornbill ivory into such objects as netsuke.

By the early 20th century, the helmeted hornbill became rare because it was slaughtered for its casque. Now legal trade in hornbill ivory is limited to certified antiques, and hornbill-ivory carvings are more valuable than those of any true ivory.
