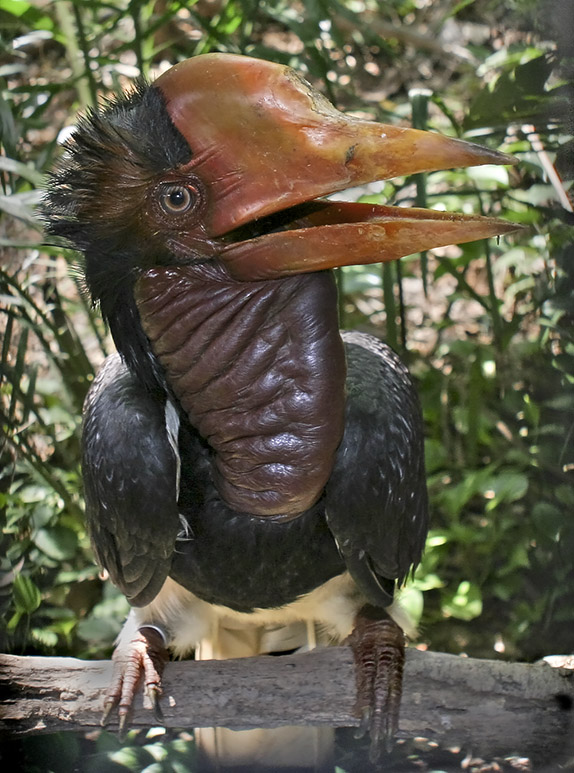
- Immature male at Jurong Bird Park, Singapore.

Conservation status
- Critically Endangered (IUCN 3.1)
- CITES Appendix I

Scientific classification
- Kingdom: Animalia
- Phylum: Chordata
- Class: Aves
- Order: Bucerotiformes
- Family: Bucerotidae
- Genus: Rhinoplax; Gloger, 1841
- Species: R. vigil

Binomial name
- Rhinoplax vigil (Pennant, 1781)

Synonyms
- Buceros vigil Forster, 1781

= Helmeted hornbill =

Species of bird

The helmeted hornbill (Rhinoplax vigil) is a very large bird in the hornbill family. It is found on the Malay Peninsula, Sumatra, Borneo, Thailand and Myanmar. The casque (helmetlike structure on the head) accounts for some 11% of its 3 kg weight. Unlike any other hornbill, the casque is almost solid, and is used in head-to-head combat among males. It is a belief among the Punan Bah that a large helmeted hornbill guards the river between life and death.

== Description ==
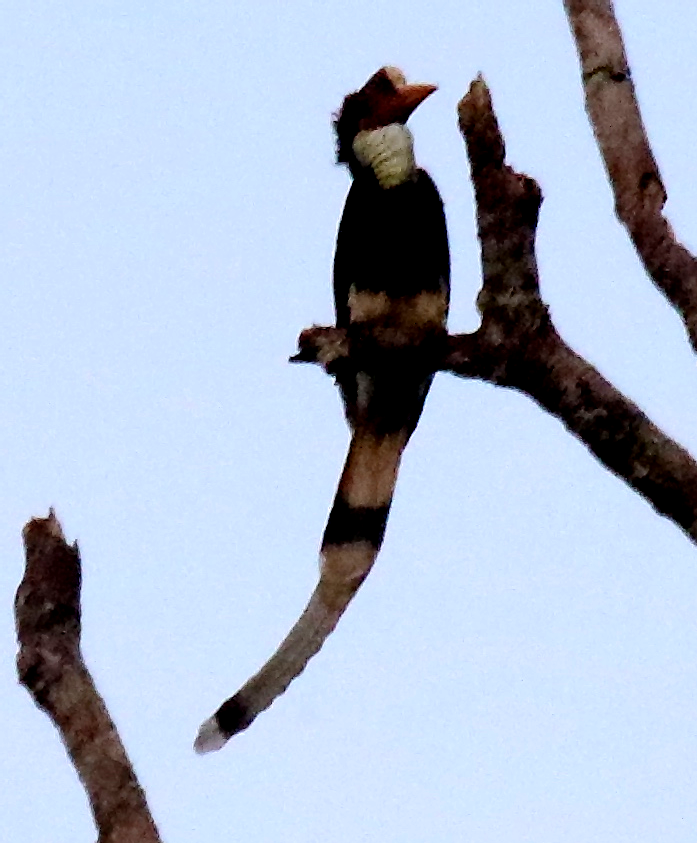
Borneo Rainforest Lodge - Danum Valley - Sabah, Borneo - Malaysia

It has mostly blackish plumage, except that the belly and legs are white and the tail is white with a black band near the tip of each feather. The tail is long and the two central tail feathers are much longer than the others, giving the bird a total length greater than that of any other hornbill species. The body length is 110–120 cm (43–47 in), not counting the tail feathers, which boost the length a further 50 cm (20 in). One male weighed 3.1 kg (6.8 lb) in weight while two females averaged about 2.7 kg (6.0 lb). Although sometimes considered the largest Asian hornbill, their body weight appears to be similar to that of the great hornbill (and considerably less than the African ground hornbills).

This species has a bare, wrinkled throat patch, pale blue to greenish in females and red in males. The casque goes from the base of the bill halfway to the tip, where it ends abruptly. It and the bill are yellow; the red secretion of the preen gland covers the sides and top of the casque and the base of the bill, but often leaves the front end of the casque and the distal half of the bill yellow. Unlike other hornbills, the helmeted hornbill's casque is solid, and the skull including the casque and bill may constitute 10 percent of the bird's weight.

== Call ==
Their call is two parts, the first consisting of a series of loud, intermittent barbet-like hoots, sometimes double-toned and over two dozen in number, which sound like the "toop" or "took" noise of an axe. These hoots gradually accelerates to climax in a cackle reminiscent of laughter; this is thought to advertise information about the caller, such as age, size, and fitness, to listening conspecifics. Because of this call, the Helmeted Hornbill is also known in Malay as the "Kill your mother-in-law" bird (Tebang Mentua). It is said that there once was a man who disliked his mother-in-law so much that he chopped down the stilts that supported her house while she was still inside of it to get rid of her. As punishment, the gods transformed him into the Helmeted Hornbill and so he was condemned to relive his crime forever by mimicking the sound of an axe striking foundation posts, followed with cackling glee at the house crashing down. The calls are audible up to 2–3 km (1.2–1.9 mi) away and can go on for minutes at a time.

== Habits ==
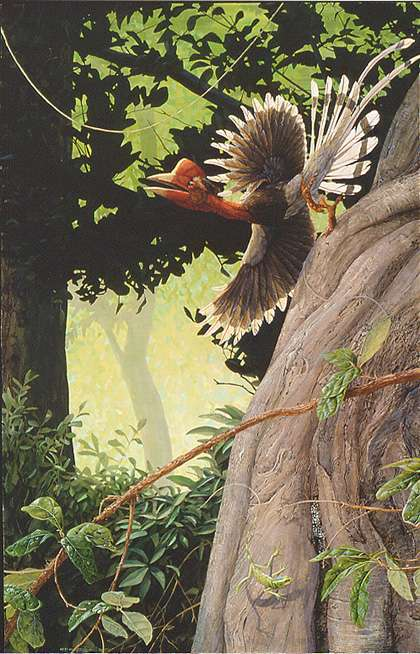
Illustration of a mature male bird, distinguishable by its casque shape and red throat area

Helmeted hornbills mostly eat the fruit of strangler figs. They are thought to be territorial and monogamous, although little is known about their social behavior. The birds breed once a year, producing a single chick. Mother and chick live inside a sealed tree cavity for the first five months of the chick's life. Their specialized nesting behavior makes them particularly vulnerable to poaching and deforestation. Males fight over territory on the wing, ramming each other with their casques. Such encounters are called aerial jousting. Females accompany males during an approach in an aerial joust but veer off in opposite directions during the collision.

== Status ==
After ongoing hunting pressure and habitat loss, the helmeted hornbill was uplisted from near threatened to critically endangered on the IUCN Red List of Threatened Species in 2015. It is listed in Appendix I of CITES. According to the conservation group TRAFFIC, 2,170 casques were confiscated in just three years in China and Indonesia alone. There are fewer than 100 birds remaining in Thai forests. At least 546 hornbill parts, mostly casques of helmeted hornbills, have been posted for sale on Thai Facebook in the past five years. Traders will pay villagers 5,000-6,000 baht (US$165–200) for a hornbill head. Prices double or triple in cities and increase exponentially when sold overseas. No specimens are held in captivity. Both the Jurong Bird Park and the Penang Bird Park previously held pairs.

== Ivory casque ==
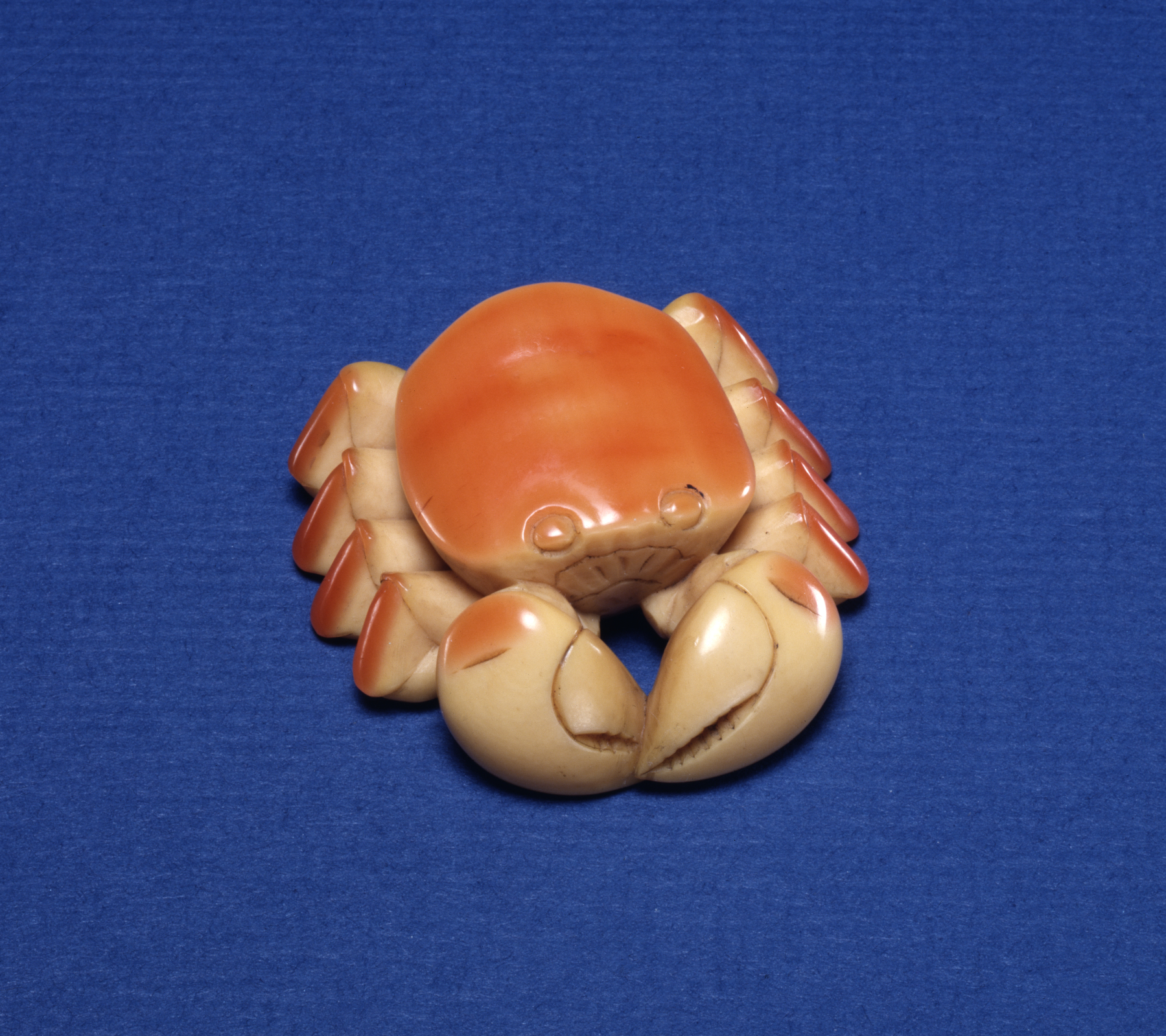
19th-century Japanese belt ornament in hornbill ivory, showing natural preen gland colouring

The casque is the source of hornbill ivory, a valuable carving material. Indigenous peoples also use the central tail feathers to decorate dancing cloaks and head-dresses. Historically, the casque was also used by carvers in China and Japan.

== Cultural significance ==
Along with the closely related rhinoceros hornbill, the Helmeted Hornbill is prominent in the cultural practices of many indigenous groups in northern Borneo. These birds are featured in various legends, symbolizing themes such as life, death, and bravery. In the Punan Bah culture, helmeted hornbills guard the passage between life and the afterlife and judge the worth of those who pass. This species is also associated with beliefs regarding headhunting. The Orang Ulu of northeastern Malaysia only allowed those who have taken a head to wear the Helmeted Hornbill's feathers. Beyond spiritual symbolism, the bird's casques and feathers play a vital role in various rituals and ceremonies. The Orang Ulu carved elaborate grave markers, centerpieces, and ear-rings from hornbill casques. Many native peoples used the two long, central tail feathers to adorn ceremonial attire and weapons for weddings, funerals, and other official functions. Hornbills were traditionally hunted for their meat using blowpipes.
