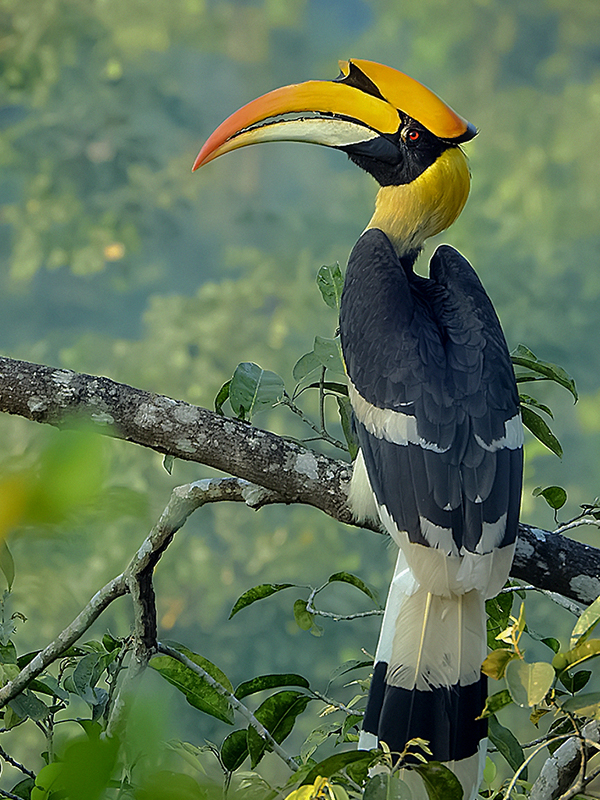
- Male
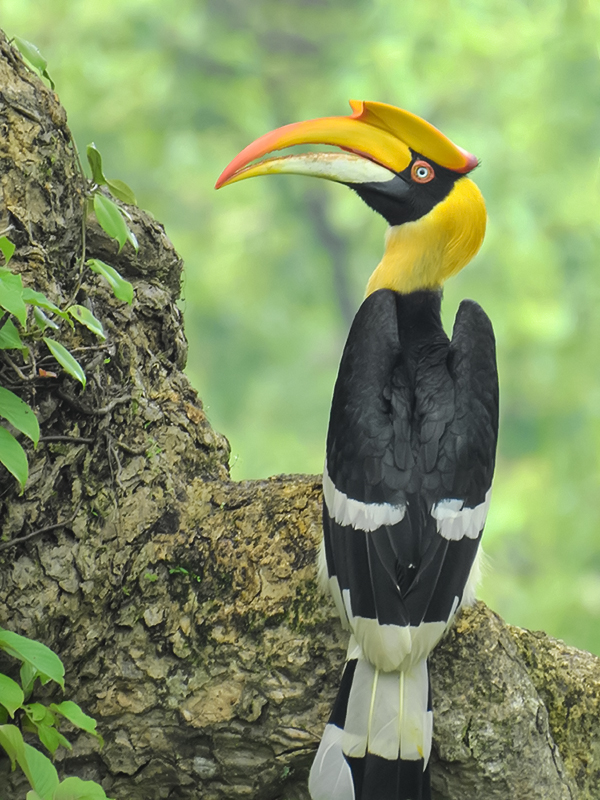
- Female

Conservation status
- Vulnerable (IUCN 3.1)
- CITES Appendix I

Scientific classification
- Kingdom: Animalia
- Phylum: Chordata
- Class: Aves
- Order: Bucerotiformes
- Family: Bucerotidae
- Genus: Buceros
- Species: B. bicornis

Binomial name
- Buceros bicornis Linnaeus, 1758

Synonyms
- Buceros homrai, Dichoceros bicornis, Buceros cavatus, Homraius bicornis, Dichoceros cavatus, Buceros cristatus

= Great hornbill =

Bird species

The great hornbill (Buceros bicornis), also known as the concave-casqued hornbill, great Indian hornbill or great pied hornbill, is one of the larger members of the hornbill family. It occurs in the Indian subcontinent and Southeast Asia. It is predominantly frugivorous, but also preys on small mammals, reptiles, and birds. It has been listed as Vulnerable on the IUCN Red List since 2018. It is known to have lived for nearly 50 years in captivity. Due to its large size and colour, and importance in many tribal cultures and rituals, the Government of Kerala declared it as the official Kerala state bird. It is also the state bird of Arunachal Pradesh.

== Taxonomy ==
The great hornbill was formally described by the Swedish naturalist Carl Linnaeus in 1758 in the tenth edition of his Systema Naturae. He placed it with the rhinoceros hornbill in the genus Buceros and coined the binomial name Buceros bicornis. Linnaeus specified the location as China. The genus name is from Latin becerus meaning "horned like an ox" which in turn is from the Ancient Greek boukerōs which combines bous meaning "ox" with kerōs meaning "horn". The specific bicornis is Latin and means "two-horned". The species is monotypic: no subspecies are recognised.

The species was formerly broken into subspecies cavatus in the Western Ghats, and homrai, the nominate form in the sub-Himalayan forests. The subspecies in Sumatra was sometimes called cristatus. Variation across populations is mainly in size, Himalayan birds being larger than those further south, and the species is now usually considered monotypic.

== Description ==
The great hornbill is a large bird, 95–130 cm (37–51 in) long, with a 152 cm (60 in) wingspan and a weight of 2 to 4 kg (4.4 to 8.8 lb). The average weight of males is 3 kg (6.6 lb) whereas that of females is 2.59 kg (5.7 lb). It is the heaviest, but not the longest, Asian hornbill. With the separation of the ground hornbills into a separate family, Bucorvidae, the great hornbill reigns as the heaviest of all typical hornbills. Females are smaller than males and have bluish-white instead of red eyes, although the orbital skin is pinkish. Like other hornbills, they have prominent "eyelashes".

The most prominent feature of the hornbill is the bright yellow and black casque on top of its massive bill. The casque appears U-shaped when viewed from the front, and the top is concave, with two ridges along the sides that form points in the front, whence the Latin species epithet bicornis (two-horned). The back of the casque is reddish in females, while the underside of the front and back of the casque is black in males.

The casque is hollow and serves no known purpose, although it is thought to be the result of sexual selection. Male hornbills indulge in aerial casque butting, with birds striking each other in flight. The male spreads the preen gland secretion, which is yellow, onto the primary feathers and bill to give them the bright yellow colour. The commissure of the beak is black and has a serrated edge which becomes worn with age.

The wing beats are heavy, and the sound produced by birds in flight can be heard from a distance. This sound has been likened to the puffing of a steam locomotive starting up. The flight involves stiff flaps followed by glides with the fingers splayed and upcurled.

Like other members of the hornbill family, they have highly pneumatized bones, with hollow air cavities extending to the tips of the wing bones. This anatomical feature was noted by Richard Owen, who dissected a specimen that died at the Zoological Society of London in 1833.

== Distribution and habitat ==
The great hornbill is native to the forests of India, Bhutan, Nepal, Mainland Southeast Asia, Sumatra, and Ujung Kulon of Java. Its distribution is fragmented in the Western Ghats and in the foothills of the Himalayas. Deforestation has reduced its range in many parts of India such as in the Kolli hills where it was recorded in the 1860s.

It prefers dense old growth unlogged forests in hilly regions. It appears to be dependent on large stretches of rain forests.

In Thailand, the home range of males was found to be about 3.7 km (2.3 mi) during the breeding season and about 14.7 km (9.1 mi) during the non-breeding season. Molecular approaches to the study of its population diversity have been attempted.

== Behaviour and ecology ==
=== Food and feeding ===
Great hornbills are usually seen in small parties, with larger groups sometimes aggregating at fruit trees. A congregation of 150 to 200 birds has been recorded in southeastern Bhutan. In the wild, the great hornbill's diet consists mainly of fruit, rarely flowers and buds. Figs are particularly important as a food source. Vitex altissima has been noted as another important food source. Great hornbills also forage on lipid-rich fruits of the families Lauraceae and Myristicaceae such as Persea, Alseodaphne, Beilschmiedia, Knema and Myristica. They obtain water entirely from their diet of fruits. They are important dispersers of many forest tree species. They will also eat small mammals, birds, small reptiles, amphibians, large insects and other arthropods. Lion-tailed macaques have been seen to forage alongside these hornbills.

They forage along branches, moving along by hopping, looking for insects, nestling birds and small lizards, tearing up bark and examining them. Prey are caught, tossed in the air and swallowed. A rare squirrel, the Travancore flying squirrel (Petinomys fuscocapillus) has been eaten, and Indian scops owl (Otus bakkamoena), jungle owlet (Glaucidium radiatum) and Sri Lanka green pigeon (Treron pompadora) have been taken as prey in the Western Ghats.

=== Breeding ===
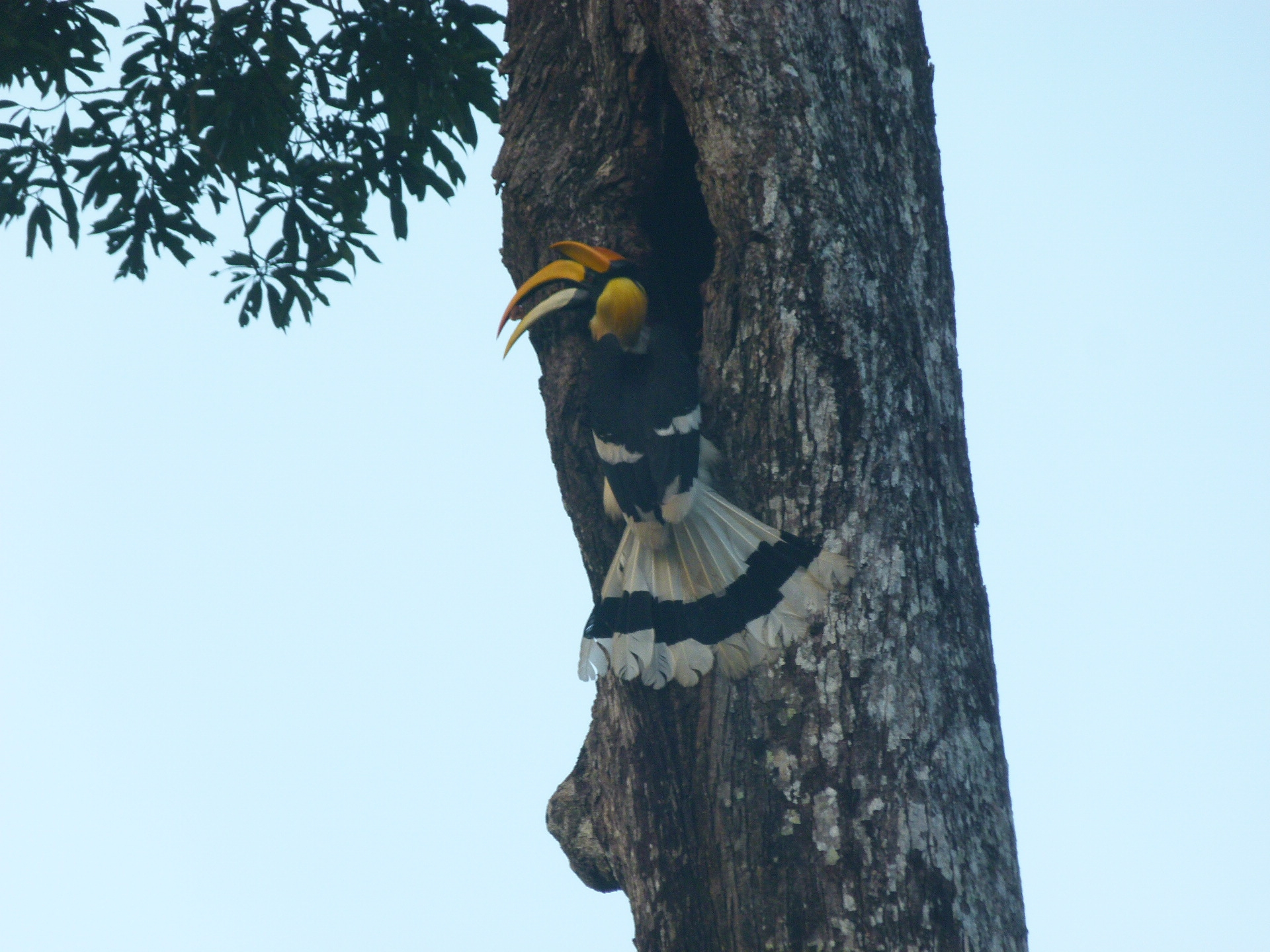
Male feeding the female at the nest

During the breeding season (January to April) great hornbills become very vocal. They make loud duets, beginning with a loud "kok" given about once a second by the male, to which the female joins in. The pair then calls in unison, turning into a rapid mixture of roars and barks. They prefer mature forests for nesting. Large, tall and old trees, particularly emergents that rise above the canopy, seem to be preferred for nesting. They form monogamous pair bonds and live in small groups of 2-40 individuals. Group courtship displays involving up to 20 birds have been observed.

The female hornbill builds a nest in the hollow of a large tree trunk, sealing the opening with a plaster made up mainly of feces. She remains imprisoned there, relying on the male to bring her food, until the chicks are half developed. During this period the female undergoes a complete moult. The young chicks have no feathers and appear very plump. The mother is fed by her mate through a slit in the seal. The clutch consists of one or two eggs, which she incubates for 38–40 days. The female voids feces through the nest slit, as do the chicks from the age of two weeks. Once the female emerges from the nest, the chicks seal it again.

The young birds have no trace of a casque. After the second year the front extremity separates from the culmen, and in the third year it becomes a transverse crescent with the two edges growing outwards and upwards, while the anterior widens to the width of the rear end. Full development takes five years.

=== Roosting ===
Great Hornbill (Buceros bicornis) in Kurseong, West Bengal, India.

Roost sites are used regularly and birds arrive punctually at sunset from long distances, following the same routes each day. Several tall trees in the vicinity may be used, the birds choosing the highest branches with little foliage. They jockey for position until late at dusk. When sleeping they draw their neck back and the bill is held upwards at an angle.

== Threats ==
The great hornbill is threatened mainly by habitat loss due to deforestation. It is hunted for its meat, fat and body parts like casque and tail feathers, which are used as adornments. Tribal peoples hunt the great Indian hornbill for its various parts. The beaks and head are used in charms and the flesh is believed to be medicinal. Young birds are considered a delicacy. Declines in population have been noted in many areas such as Cambodia.

Tribesmen in parts of northeastern India use the feathers for head-dresses, and the skulls are often worn as decorations. The Sema Nagas consider the flesh unfit for eating, believing that it produces sores on their feet, as in the bird. When dancing with the feathers of the hornbill, they avoid eating vegetables, as doing so is also believed to produce the same sores on the feet.

== Conservation ==
The great hornbill is listed in CITES Appendix I. It has been listed as Vulnerable on the IUCN Red List since 2018. Conservation programmes have attempted to provide tribes with feathers from captive hornbills and ceramic casques to substitute for natural ones.

=== In captivity ===
Very few hornbills are held in captivity, and few of them breed well. Females at the nests are extremely easy to capture, and birds caught in the wild are mostly female. Breeding them in captivity has been notoriously difficult, with fewer than a dozen successful attempts. Their extreme selectivity for mates and their long and strong pair bonds make them difficult to maintain for breeding.

Captive great hornbills eat fruits and meat, a healthy diet consisting mostly of fruit and some source of protein. A few have been tamed in captivity but their behaviour in captivity is described as highly strung. Captive specimens bask in the sun with outstretched wings.

== In culture ==
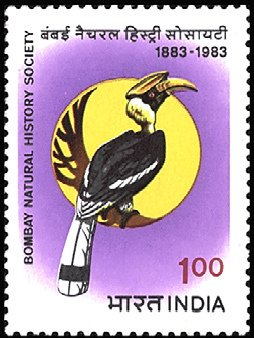
India Post 1983 stamp of the Great Hornbill

The great hornbill is called homrai in Nepal and banrao in Mussoorie, both meaning "King of the Jungle". It is the official state bird of the Indian states of Kerala where it is called Vezhambal (വേഴാമ്പൽ). It is also the official bird of Arunachal Pradesh.

=== Use as a symbol ===
A great hornbill named William was the model for the logo of the Bombay Natural History Society and the name of the society's building. Norman Kinnear described William as follows in the obituary of Walter Samuel Millard:

Every visitor to the Society's room in Apollo Street will remember the Great Indian Hornbill, better known as the "office canary" which lived in a cage behind Millard's chair in Phipson & Co.'s office for 26 years and died in 1920. It is said its death was caused by swallowing a piece of wire, but in the past "William" had swallowed a lighted cigar without ill effects and I for my part think that the loss of his old friend was the principal cause.

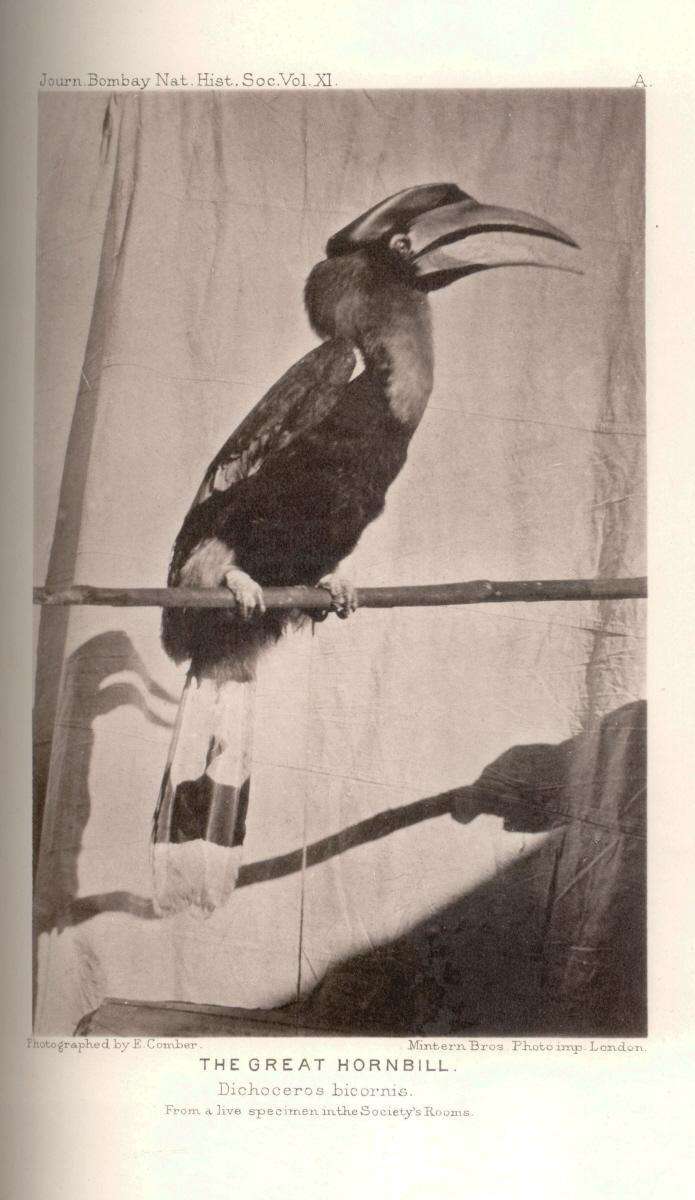
William, the captive hornbill that was used for the BNHS logo

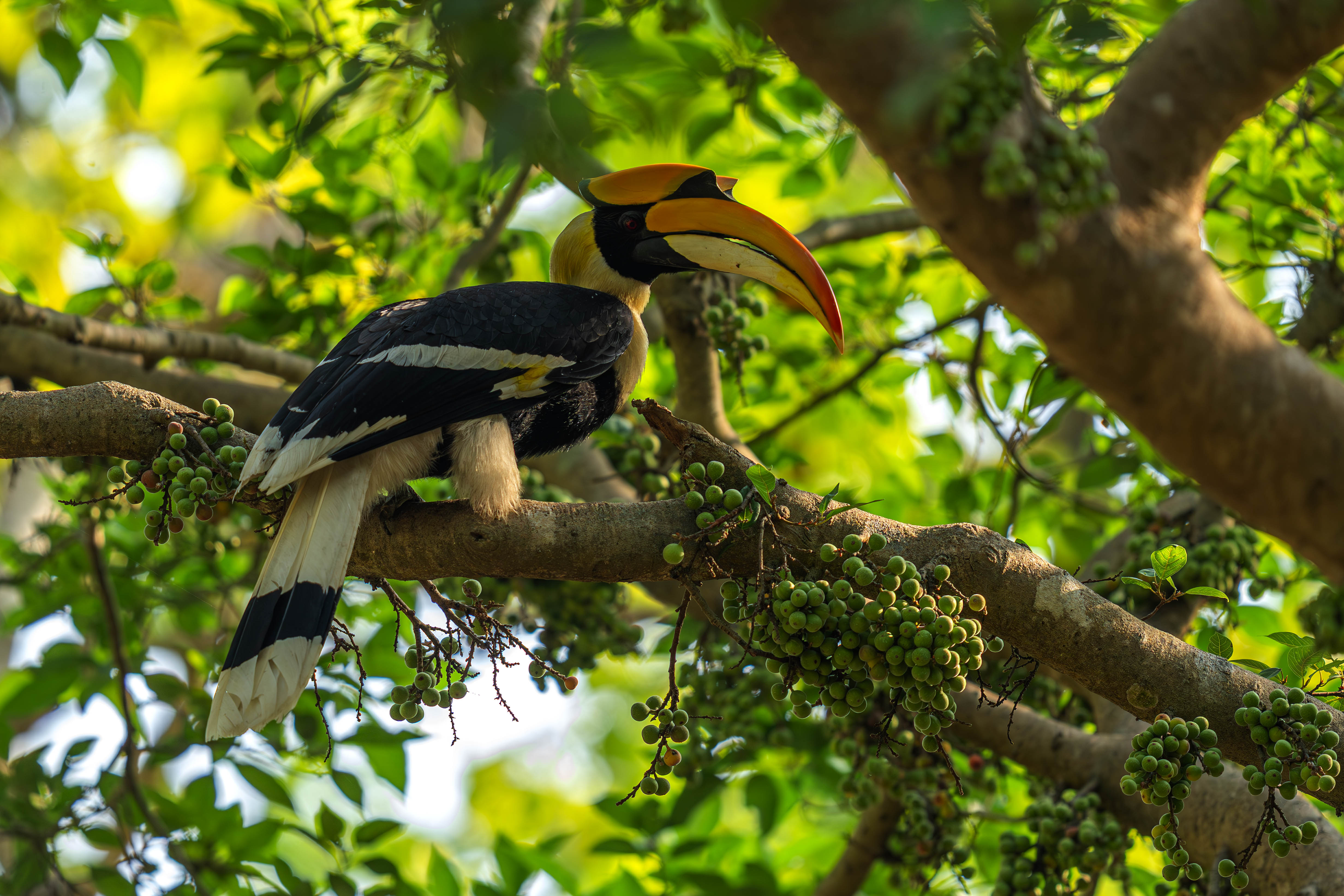
Great hornbill at Bardiya National Park

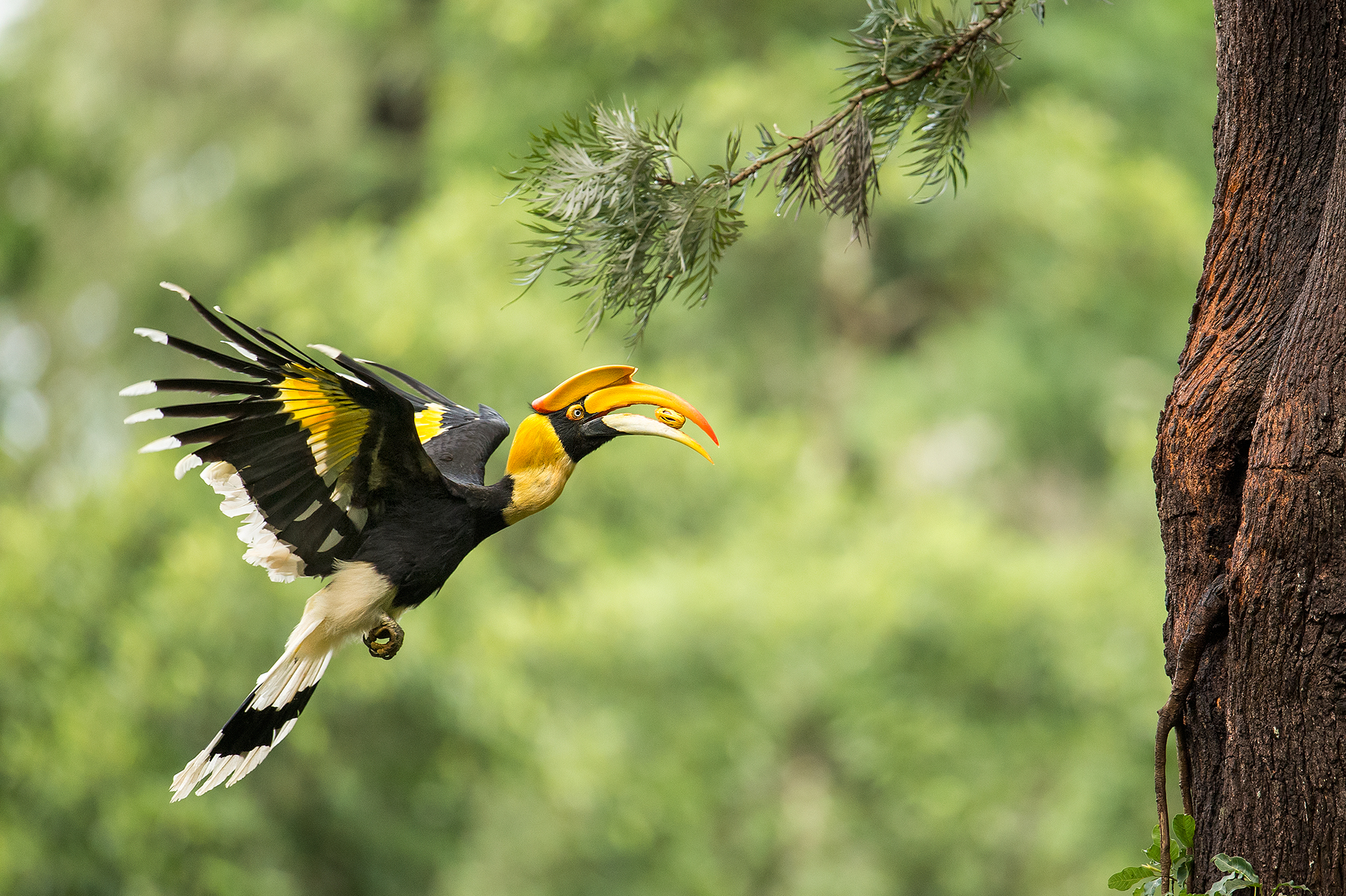
A female carries fruit of Myristica beddomei for her young

The iris, underside of the casque and orbital skin colours vary between the sexes

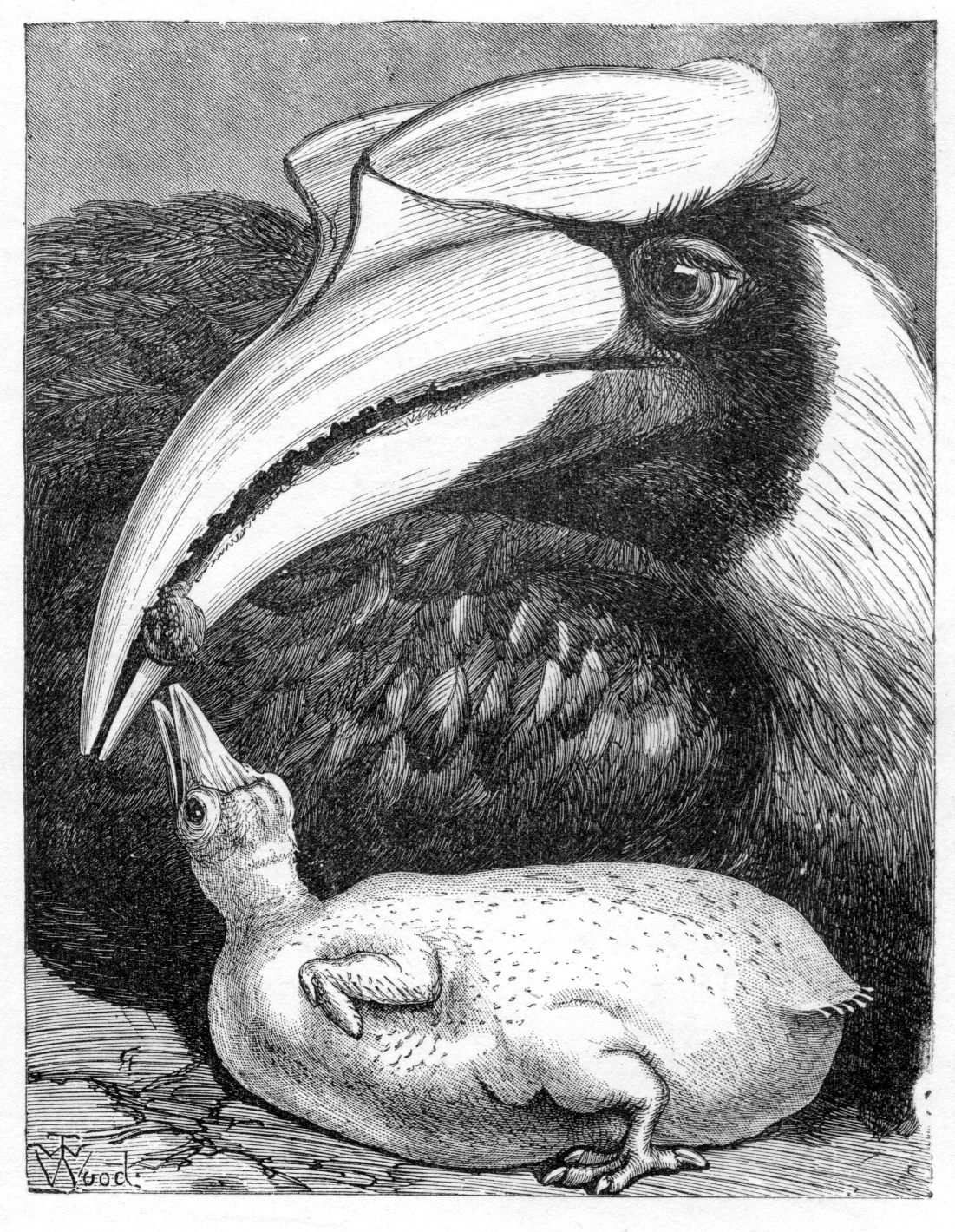
Illustration by T. W. Wood showing the eyelashes, worn bill edge and the concave casque with ridged sides

== Other sources ==
- Kannan, R. (1993). "Saving the Great Indian Hornbill". Hornbill magazine. Bombay Natural History Society 1993(4):4–7.
- Kannan, R. (1994). Ecology and Conservation of the Great Pied Hornbill (Buceros bicornis) in the Western Ghats of southern India. Ph.D. thesis, University of Arkansas, Fayetteville.
- Kannan, Ragupathy (1994). "Conservation ecology of the Great Hornbill in the Western Ghats, southern India". OBC Bull. 19: 13.
- Kannan, R. and James, D. A. (2007). "Phenological studies of hornbill fruit trees in tropical rainforests: methodologies, problems, and pitfalls". pp. 155–166 in Kemp, A.C. and M.I. Kemp (eds.). The Active Management of Hornbills for Conservation. CD-ROM Proceedings of the 4th International Hornbill Conference, Mabula Game Lodge, Bela Bela, South Africa. Naturalists and Nomads, Pretoria.
- Kannan, R. and James, D. A. (2008). "Fig trees (Ficus), captive elephants, and conservation of hornbills and other frugivores in an Indian wildlife sanctuary". J. Bombay. Nat. Hist. Soc. 105(2):238-242.
- Poonswad, P. (1995). "Nest site characteristics of four sympatric species of hornbills in Khao Yai National Park, Thailand". Ibis 137: 183–191.
