= Addilal (exclosure) =

Exclosure for woodland restoration in Ethiopia

Addilal exclosure
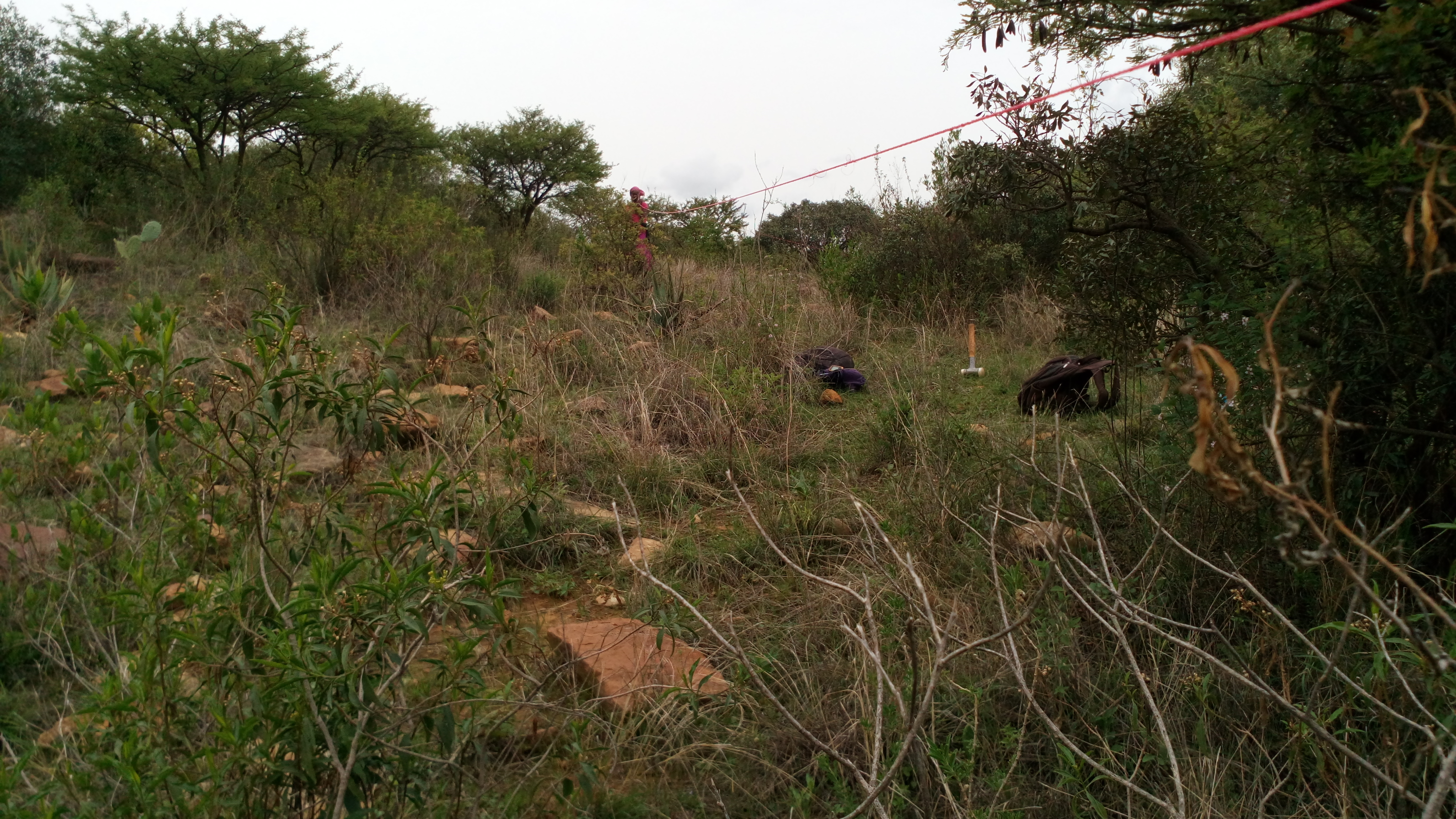
- Addilal exclosure

- Location within Ethiopia
- Location: Addilal municipality, in Dogu’a Tembien district, Ethiopia
- Nearest city: Hagere Selam
- Coordinates: 13.673°N 39.333°E
- Area: 416 ha (1,030 acres)
- Established: 1992
- Website: https://ethiotrees.com

Addilal is an exclosure located in the Dogu'a Tembien woreda of the Tigray Region in Ethiopia. The area has been protected since 1992 by the local community.

== Timeline ==
- 1992: established as exclosure by the community
- 2017: support by the EthioTrees project

== Environmental characteristics ==
- Area: 145 ha
- Average slope gradient: 21%
- Aspect: the exclosure is oriented towards the south and the west
- Minimum altitude: 2030 metres
- Maximum altitude: 2212 metres
- Lithology: Antalo Limestone

== Management ==
As a general rule, cattle ranging and wood harvesting are not allowed. The grasses are harvested once yearly and taken to the homesteads of the village to feed livestock. There are two guards to protect the exclosure. Field observations showed that no illegal grazing occurred in the exclosure in 2018.

== Benefits for the community ==
Setting aside such areas fits with the long-term vision of the communities were hiza’iti lands are set aside for use by the future generations. It has also direct benefits for the community:

- improved ground water availability
- honey production
- climate ameliorator (temperature, moisture)
- the sequestered carbon (in total 52 tonnes per ha, dominantly sequestered in the soil, and additionally in the woody vegetation) is certified using the Plan Vivo voluntary carbon standard, after which carbon credits are sold
- the revenues are then reinvested in the villages, according to the priorities of the communities; it may be for an additional class in the village school, a water pond, conservation in the exclosures, or a store for incense.

== Biodiversity ==
With vegetation growth, biodiversity in this exclosure hast strongly improved, not only with regard to flora but also with regard to fauna. Particularly, with regard to birdlife, key species include Clapperton's francolin, eastern grey plantain-eater, black-billed wood hoopoe, Hemprich's hornbill, red-billed hornbill, banded, black-billed and yellow-breasted barbet, grey-headed batis and northern black tit.
