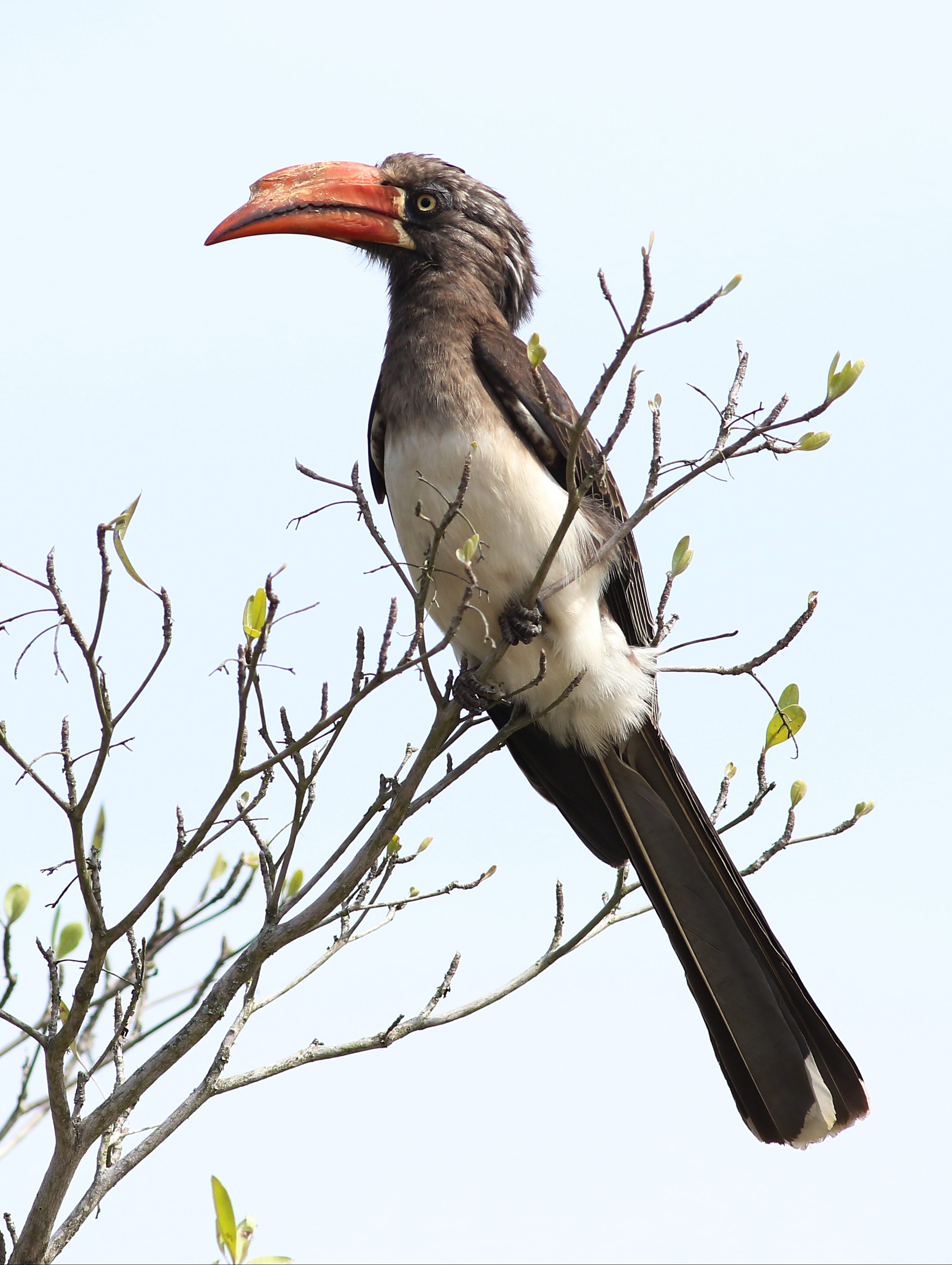
- Adult male at Ndumo Game Reserve in KwaZulu Natal, South Africa

Conservation status
- Least Concern (IUCN 3.1)

Scientific classification
- Kingdom: Animalia
- Phylum: Chordata
- Class: Aves
- Order: Bucerotiformes
- Family: Bucerotidae
- Genus: Lophoceros
- Species: L. alboterminatus

Binomial name
- Lophoceros alboterminatus Büttikofer, 1889
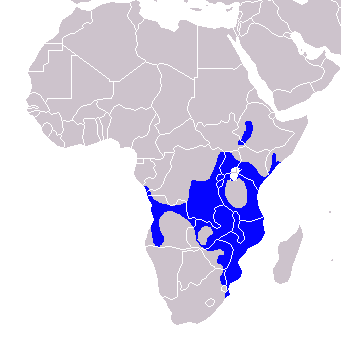
- approximate distribution (range extends to the southern Cape)

Synonyms
- Lophoceros alboterminatus

= Crowned hornbill =

Species of bird

The crowned hornbill (Lophoceros alboterminatus) is an African hornbill.

== Description ==
It is a medium-sized bird, 50–54 centimetres (20–21 in) in length, and is characterized by its white belly and black back and wings. The tips of the long tail feathers are white. The eyes are yellow; the beak is red and presents a stocky casque on the upper mandible. In females, the casque is smaller. The crowned hornbill can be distinguished from the similar Bradfield's hornbill by its shorter beak.

== Habitat ==
The crowned hornbill is a common resident of the coastal and riverine forests of southern (only the eastern coast) to northeastern Africa.

== Diet ==
It forages mainly in trees, where it feeds on insects (often caught in flight), small rodents, small reptiles, eggs, seeds and fruits. This hornbill species can be seen in flocks, usually in the dry season. Four to five white eggs are incubated for 25 to 30 days; the juveniles remain with both parents for about 8 weeks.
