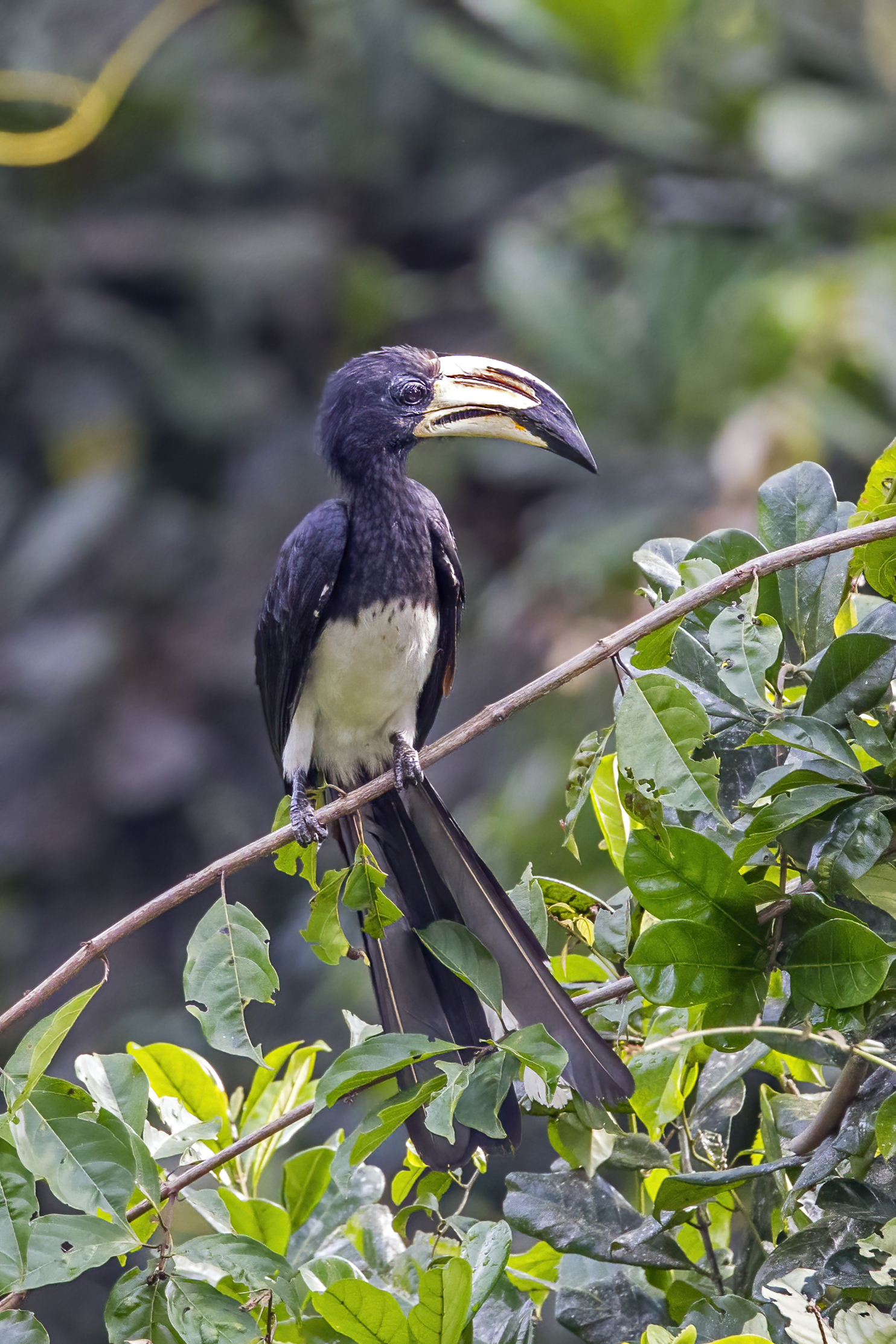
- Male in Ghana

Conservation status
- Least Concern (IUCN 3.1)

Scientific classification
- Kingdom: Animalia
- Phylum: Chordata
- Class: Aves
- Order: Bucerotiformes
- Family: Bucerotidae
- Genus: Lophoceros
- Species: L. semifasciatus

Binomial name
- Lophoceros semifasciatus (Hartlaub, 1855)
- Range

= West African pied hornbill =

Species of bird

The West African pied hornbill (Lophoceros semifasciatus) is a bird of the hornbill family, a family of tropical birds found in the Old World.

The West African pied hornbill is found in West Africa, from south Nigeria to Senegal and Gambia—primarily in secondary forest areas of the Guinean-Congolese forest, and is threatened by forest fragmentation. It was previously considered conspecific with the Congo pied hornbill, and was split in IOC 13.2.

It is a frugivore.
