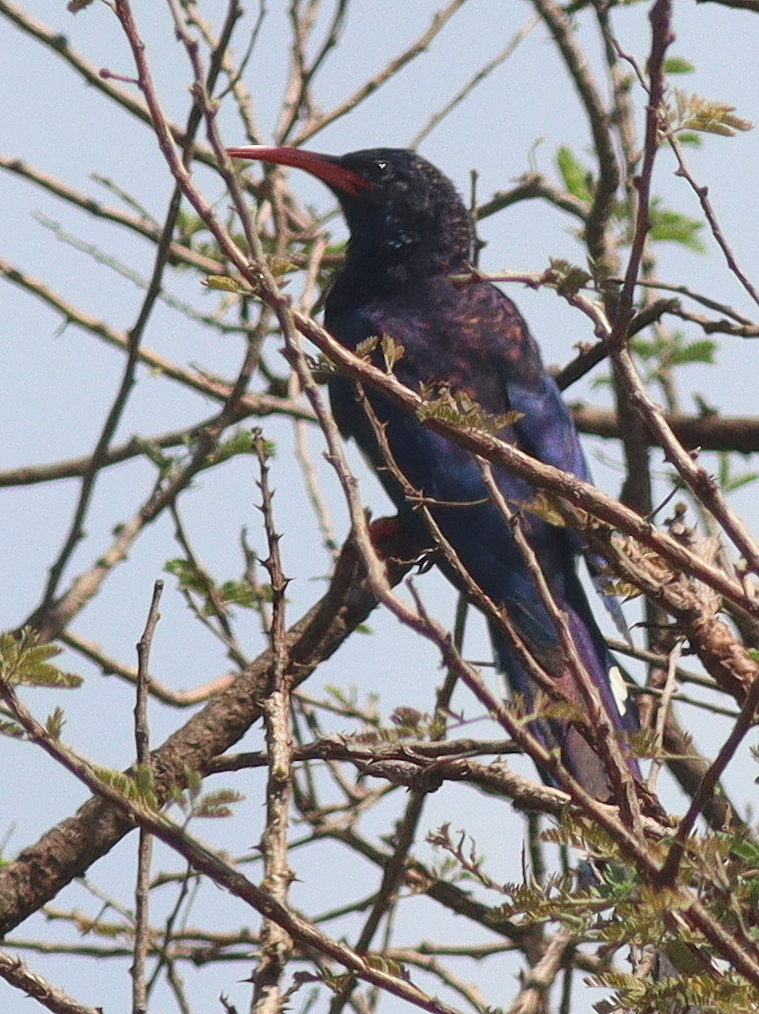
- Illustration (above) with black-billed wood hoopoe (below)

Conservation status
- Least Concern (IUCN 3.1)

Scientific classification
- Kingdom: Animalia
- Phylum: Chordata
- Class: Aves
- Order: Bucerotiformes
- Family: Phoeniculidae
- Genus: Phoeniculus
- Species: P. damarensis

Binomial name
- Phoeniculus damarensis (Ogilvie-Grant, 1901)
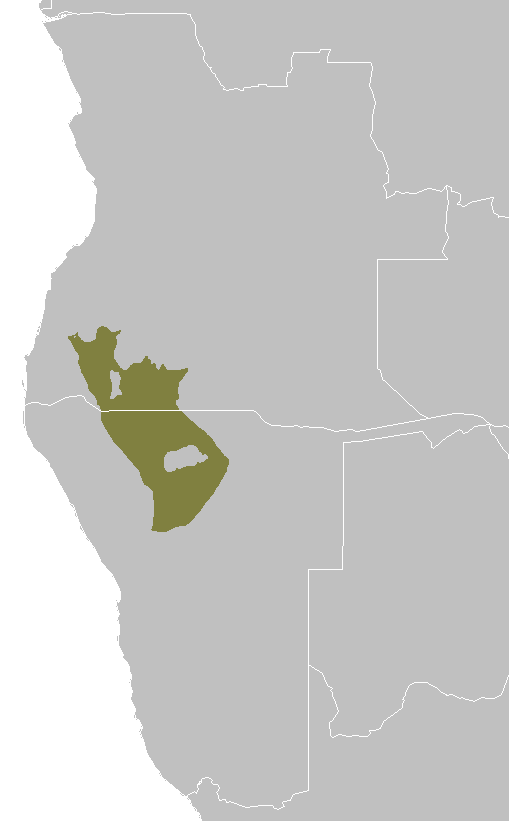
- General range: the Angolan mopane woodlands

= Violet wood hoopoe =

Species of bird

The violet wood hoopoe (Phoeniculus damarensis) is a species of bird in the family Phoeniculidae. It is found in Angola, Kenya, Namibia, and Tanzania. It looks similar to the black-billed wood hoopoe but with a red beak and a green throat. It has coppery and violet mantle feathers.

== Taxonomy ==
The violet wood hoopoe was formally described in 1901 by the Scottish ornithologist William Robert Ogilvie-Grant under the binomial name Irrisor damarensis. The specific epithet is from Damaraland in Namibia. The violet wood hoopoe is now one of five species placed in the genus Phoeniculus that was introduced in 1821 by the Polish zoologist Feliks Paweł Jarocki.

Two subspecies are recognised:

- P. d. damarensis (Ogilvie-Grant, 1901) – Angola and Namibia
- P. d. granti (Neumann, 1903) – central, southeast Kenya

The subspecies P. d. granti has sometimes been considered as a separate species as its distribution is separated by a very large distance from that of the nominate race.

The violet wood hoopoe was formerly considered to be conspecific with the green wood hoopoe (Phoeniculus purpureus). It has been argued that the violet wood hoopoe should be considered as a distinct species because of its more terrestrial foraging behaviour compared to the more arboreal foraging of the green wood hoopoe.
