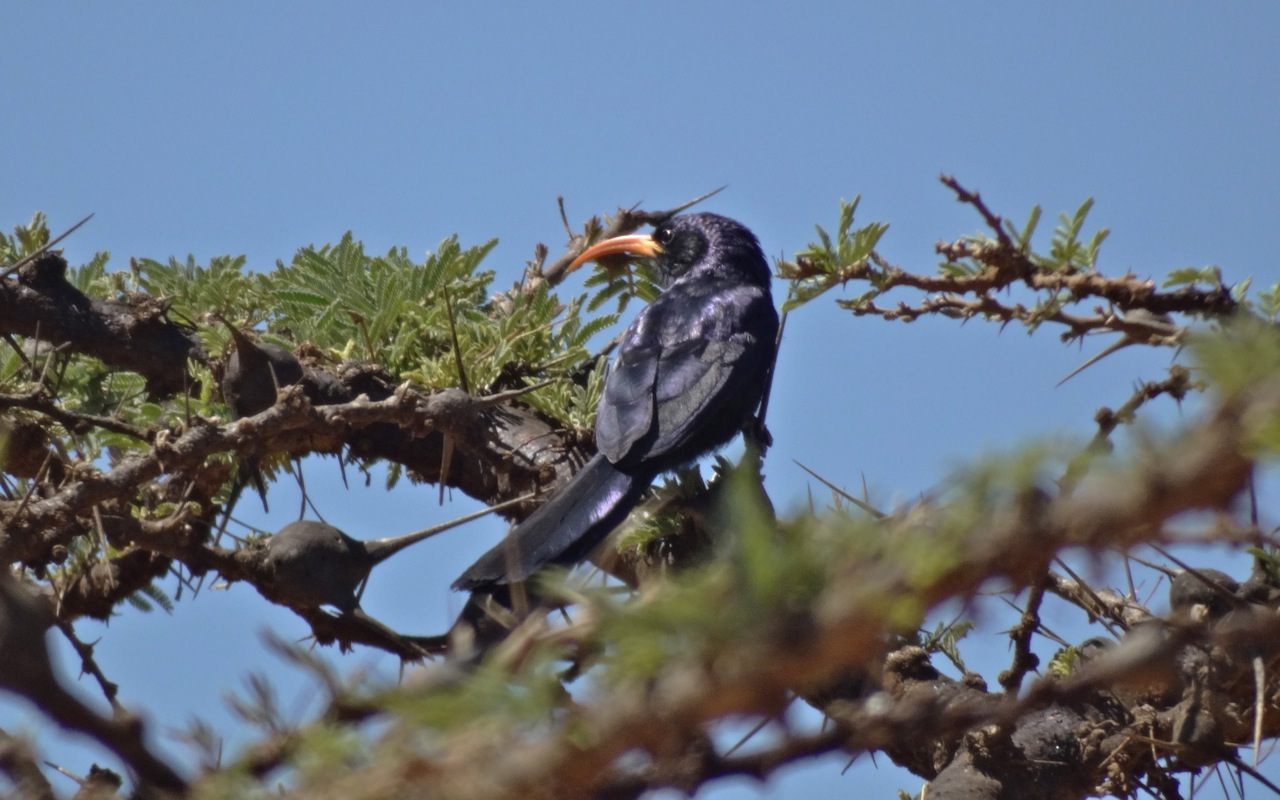
- Adult bird in Laikipia, Kenya

Conservation status
- Least Concern (IUCN 3.1)

Scientific classification
- Kingdom: Animalia
- Phylum: Chordata
- Class: Aves
- Order: Bucerotiformes
- Family: Phoeniculidae
- Genus: Rhinopomastus
- Species: R. minor

Binomial name
- Rhinopomastus minor (Rüppell, 1845)

= Abyssinian scimitarbill =

Species of bird

The Abyssinian scimitarbill (Rhinopomastus minor) is a species of bird in the family Phoeniculidae. The term Abyssinia, is an old name for the region of Ethiopia, and scimitar refers to a curved sword, which its bill resembles. It is found in Djibouti, Ethiopia, Kenya, Somalia, South Sudan, Tanzania, and Uganda. The bird is non migratory, diurnal, and terrestrial. Their nests are sometimes parasitized by the greater honeyguide (Indicator indicator) which are favored by some because they can guide to beehives.

== Description ==
The bird is all black with a blue-purple iridescence which covers their whole body and especially the back of the head. The bird's beak is bright orange to red and is characteristically curved and pointed. It is slightly longer than the length of its head and is built to probe into cracks and crevices for insects. It can be differentiated from other wood hoopoes by its all black legs and shorter tail, which is about the length of the bird's body excluding its head.

=== Sexual Dimorphism ===
The males coloring tends to be more blue, whereas the females have more brown tones especially in the head. Males also tend to be slightly larger than females. Their bill length is: Male; 3.33 cm; Female; 2.78 cm. Their tail length is: Male: 10.7 cm; Female; 9.5 cm. Their body mass is around 22-28g with the males being on the heavier end.

== Taxonomy ==
The bird is the smallest in the group of Scimitarbills which contains three other species. They are in the family of wood hoopoes, and in the order of Bucerotiformes which contains the hornbills, ground hornbills, hoopoes and wood hoopoes.

== Habitat and Distribution ==
The bird is found commonly in open bushed, and dry savanna habitats and is an uncommon resident in thorn scrubs in low altitudes below 1400m (an intermediate biome between a desert and tropical forest).

There are two subspecies which occupy different ranges of Africa. The Rhinopomastus minor minor occurs on the eastern edge of Africa Ethiopia to Somalia and Kenya, and Rhinopomastus minor cabsanisi occurs further west in Sudan to Ethiopia, Kenya and Tanzania. See range map

=== Distribution ===
The species has a breeding range is around the equator with minimum to maximum latitudes of -9.01 to 11.78 degrees.

The species has a combined total of around 20,000km^{2} of territorial range, although this area is largely fragmented. While the population is declining, it appears to be at a rate of only 5% over three generations and therefore the bird is considered to be of least concern.

== Behavior ==
=== Vocalizations ===
The Abyssian Scimitarbill and the Common Scimitarbill (Rhinopomastus cyanomelas) both emit sharp cries and an unpleasant odor to deter predators (Hedley & Caro, 2022). Their warning calls sound like a series of rising notes "dok". Other calls sound like shrill elongated chirps which rise and then fall minutely in pitch over the course of around eight to twelve chirps. Their song sounds similar to their calls, but with more silence between chirps. Listen here

=== Diet ===
The bird is insectivorous and eats mostly live insects such as bees, beetles, larvae, caterpillars, ants, flies and wasps. They will also eat seeds and berries. While much research has been done on the species, it has been observed to nest in abandoned beehives, although it does not consume honey or other bee products.

=== Reproduction ===
The bird is a monogamous solitary nester. The age of their first breeding is on average 1.23 years with an average clutch size of 2 eggs. The adults have an annual survival rate of 0.66 and the average length of a generatio is 2.89 years. They typically nest in holes or fissures, sometimes excavated by other species. This includes holes in trees and sometimes abandoned beehives that are a height of around 0.5-2m from the ground. The cabanisi race has a strong preference for breeding in the dry season.

==== Parasitic Nesting Interaction ====
The greater honeyguide will occasionally parasitize the nest of the scimitarbill. The exact frequency and effect that this relationship has on the species is not fully documented but there are several observations on clutch success rates.

In one case from June to July 2009, a pair raised three young in a nest box at Green park. In another case in June to July 2009, three young were raised by a pair of birds in a nest box at Greenwood Park Estate, Eburru, near Naivasha. In another instance between October 2009 to July 2012, a pair of birds laid a total of 33 eggs (11 clutches of 3) over 3 years. However, none of these eggs survived because the greater honeyguide parasitized on the clutches. During the three year period, no scimitarbills hatched, while 7 out of a total of 12 of the parasitic honeyguide eggs successfully fledged. On four cases out of eleven, the scimitarbills ejected all eggs from the nest. Later from August 2012-September 2014, four clutches (12 eggs total) were laid without any honeyguides, and all but one individual was successfully fledged.

== Gallery ==
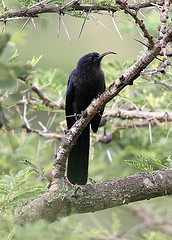
Juvenile in Tanzania
