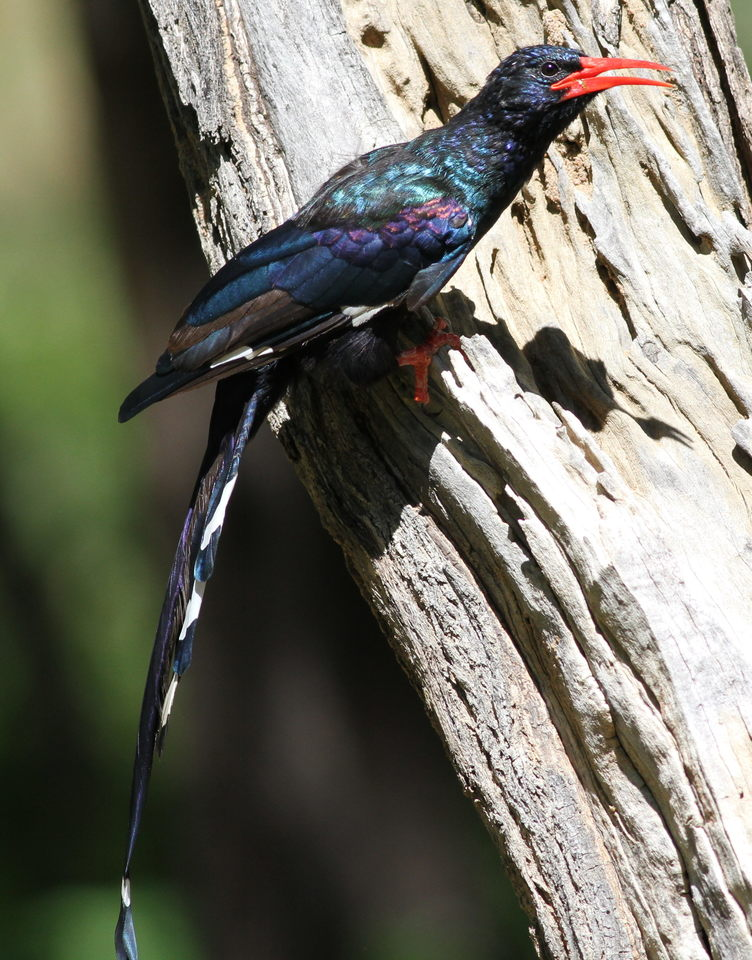
- Green wood hoopoe (Phoeniculus purpureus) at Marakele National Park, South Africa

Scientific classification
- Kingdom: Animalia
- Phylum: Chordata
- Class: Aves
- Order: Bucerotiformes
- Family: Phoeniculidae; Bonaparte, 1831

Genera
- Phoeniculus; Rhinopomastus

= Wood hoopoe =

Wood hoopoes

Family of birds

The wood hoopoes or scimitarbills are a small African bird family, Phoeniculidae. They live south of the Sahara Desert and are not migratory. While the family is now restricted to Sub-Saharan Africa, fossil evidence shows that it once had a larger distribution. Fossils attributed to this family have been found in Miocene rocks in Germany.

The wood hoopoes are related to the kingfishers, the rollers, and the hoopoe, forming a clade with this last according to Hackett et al. (2008). A close relationship between the hoopoe and the wood hoopoes is also supported by the shared and unique nature of their stapes. The wood hoopoes most resemble the true hoopoes with their long down-curved bills and short rounded wings. According to genetic studies, the two genera, Phoeniculus and Rhinopomastus, appear to have diverged about ten million years ago, so some systematists treat them as separate subfamilies or even separate families.

== Description ==
The wood hoopoes are a morphologically distinct group, unlikely to be mistaken for any other. These species are medium-sized (23–46 centimetres or 9–18 inches long, much of which is the tail). They have metallic plumage, often blue, green or purple, and lack a crest. The sexes are similar in all but two species, the forest wood hoopoe and the common scimitarbill. Their bills are either red or black, although young red-billed species also have black bills and bill colour is correlated with age. The legs are scarlet or black, short, with thick tarsi. They climb tree trunks in the manner of a woodpecker, and when feeding on the ground they hop rather than walking like the true hoopoe. Their tails are long and strongly graduated (the central feathers are the longest), and marked conspicuously with white, as are their wings.

== Range and behaviour ==
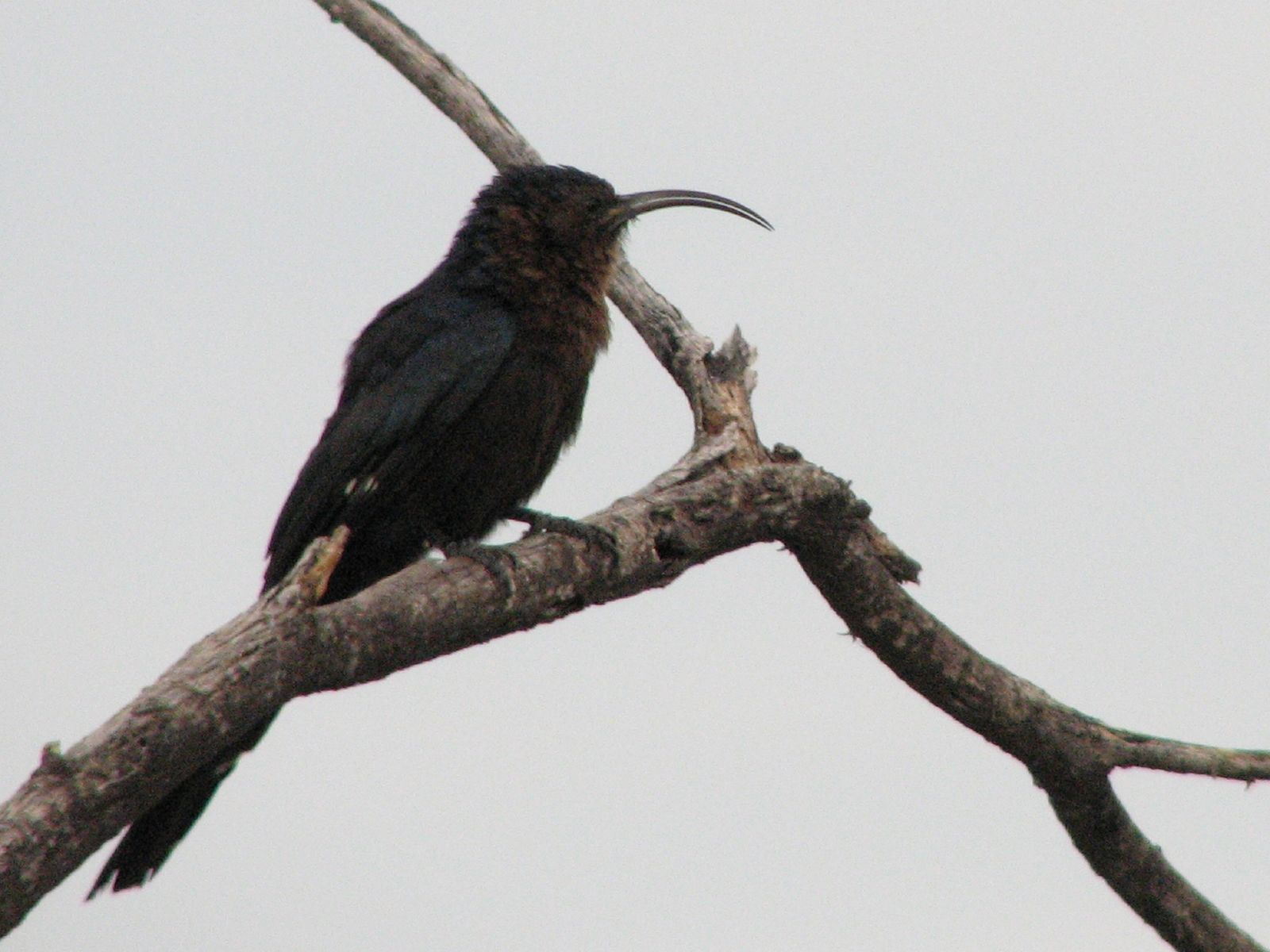
Common scimitarbill

These are birds of open woodland, savannah, or thornbrush, and are mainly arboreal. They require large trees both for feeding on as well as to provide hollows for nesting and nocturnal roosting. Two species are found exclusively in rainforest, the forest wood hoopoe and the white-headed wood hoopoe. All the other species are found in more open woodland and bush.

They feed on arthropods, especially insects, which they find by probing with their bills in rotten wood and in crevices in bark. They nest in unlined tree holes, laying two to four eggs, which are blue, grey, or olive, and unmarked in most species.

Hoopoes hunt for prey primarily on the ground as they use their tongue-like beaks to pick up insects on the soil or grass. The Hoopoe's tongue occupy 2/3 length of the beak.

== Species ==
There are eight species.

Family: Phoeniculidae

Image	Genus	Living species
	Phoeniculus Jarocki, 1821	Green wood hoopoe, Phoeniculus purpureus; Violet wood hoopoe, Phoeniculus damarensis; Black-billed wood hoopoe, Phoeniculus somaliensis; White-headed wood hoopoe, Phoeniculus bollei; Forest wood hoopoe, Phoeniculus castaneiceps
	Rhinopomastus Jardine, 1828	Black scimitarbill, Rhinopomastus aterrimus; Common scimitarbill, Rhinopomastus cyanomelas; Abyssinian scimitarbill, Rhinopomastus minor
