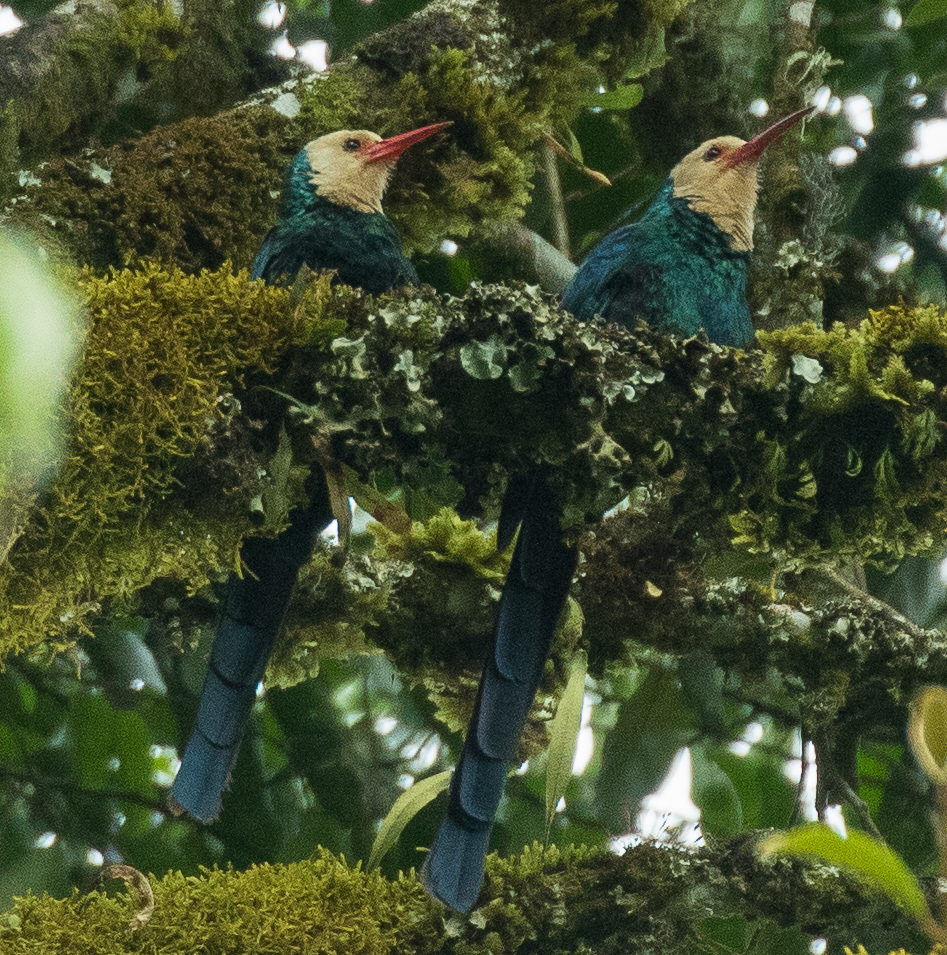

Conservation status
- Least Concern (IUCN 3.1)

Scientific classification
- Kingdom: Animalia
- Phylum: Chordata
- Class: Aves
- Order: Bucerotiformes
- Family: Phoeniculidae
- Genus: Phoeniculus
- Species: P. bollei

Binomial name
- Phoeniculus bollei (Hartlaub, 1858)

Synonyms
- Irrisor jacksoni; Irrisor bollii

= White-headed wood hoopoe =

Species of bird

The white-headed wood hoopoe (Phoeniculus bollei) is a species of bird in the family Phoeniculidae.

== Etymology ==
The bird's scientific species name bollei honors Carl August Bolle (1821–1909), a German naturalist and collector.

== Subspecies ==
Subspecies include:

- Phoeniculus bollei jacksoni (Hartlaub, 1858) — Ruwenzori Mountains to Sudan and Kenya
- Phoeniculus bollei bollei — from Liberia to the Central African Republic
- Phoeniculus bollei okuensis (Serle, 1949) — Cameroon (Lake Oku)

== Distribution ==
Phoeniculus bollei can be found in Burundi, Cameroon, Central African Republic, Democratic Republic of the Congo, Ivory Coast, Ghana, Guinea, Kenya, Liberia, Mali, Nigeria, Rwanda, South Sudan, Tanzania, and Uganda.

== Habitat ==
These birds inhabit from sea level up to 3,200 m (10,500 ft), mainly in savannas and dry lowland and in montane primary forest, but they are also found in regenerating forests, as well as in deciduous woodlands.

== Description ==
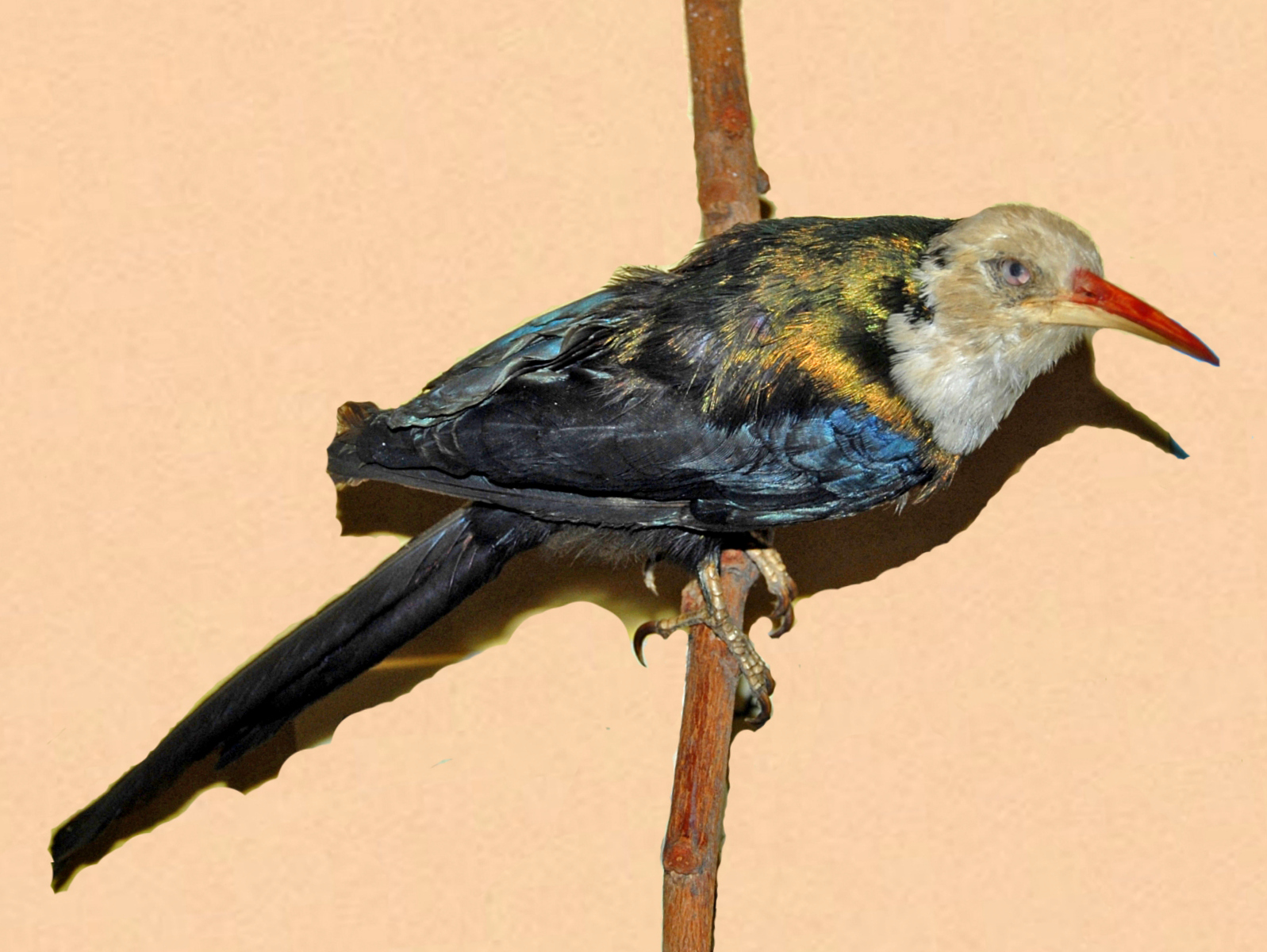
Museum specimen

Phoeniculus bollei can reach approximately a body length of 30–35 cm (12–14 in). The female is smaller and has a much shorter bill. These birds show a combination of a white head, a slightly curved bright red beak and red legs and feet, quite different from other species of the family. The iridescent plumage is dark blue or violet-blue. The wings have a purple-copper luster.

== Biology ==
These birds are very gregarious, forming groups of 2 to 10 individuals. They apparently breed almost throughout year, in both wet and dry seasons. They are predominantly insectivorous, especially feeding on various arthropods (Larvae, beetles, ants, termites, grasshoppers, spiders, etc.) and invertebrates, that they search examining tree trunks. Sometimes they also feed on berries and seeds. In the east of its range in Kenya and Tanzania it nests only in mountain biotopes above 2000 m. The nests are located in a natural cavity in a dead or healthy tree, up to 40 meters above the ground.
