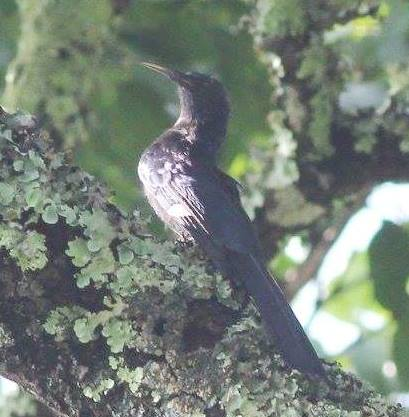
- R. a. anchietae in Angola

Conservation status
- Least Concern (IUCN 3.1)

Scientific classification
- Kingdom: Animalia
- Phylum: Chordata
- Class: Aves
- Order: Bucerotiformes
- Family: Phoeniculidae
- Genus: Rhinopomastus
- Species: R. aterrimus

Binomial name
- Rhinopomastus aterrimus (Stephens, 1826)

= Black scimitarbill =

Species of bird

The black scimitarbill (Rhinopomastus aterrimus), also known as the black wood hoopoe, is a species of bird in the family Phoeniculidae.

== Range ==
It is found in Angola, Benin, Burkina Faso, Cameroon, Central African Republic, Chad, Republic of the Congo, Democratic Republic of the Congo, Ivory Coast, Eritrea, Ethiopia, Gabon, Gambia, Ghana, Guinea, Guinea-Bissau, Mali, Mauritania, Niger, Nigeria, Senegal, Sierra Leone, Sudan, Togo, and Uganda. It is found in many savanna habitats.
