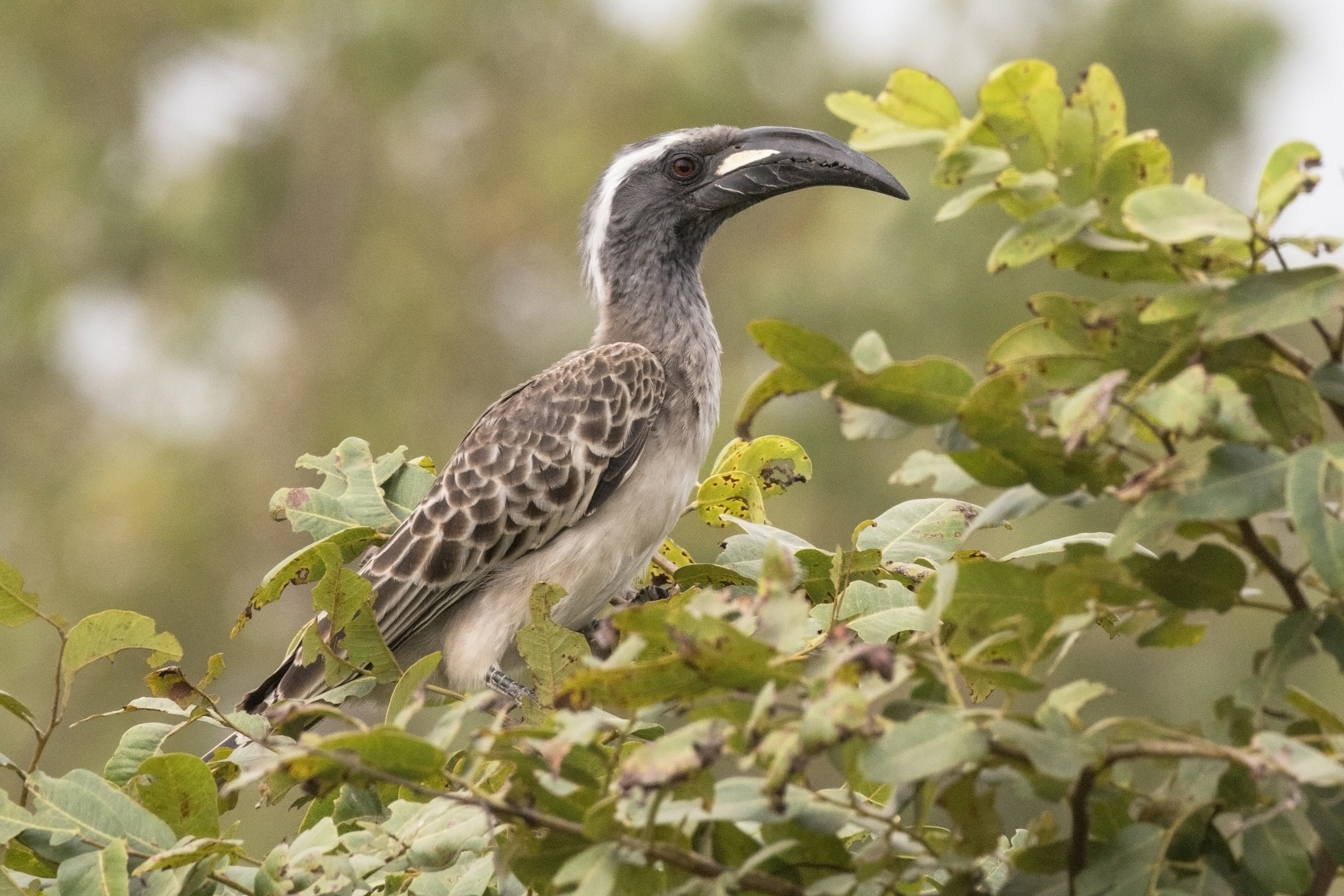
- Male L. n. nasutus in Senegal
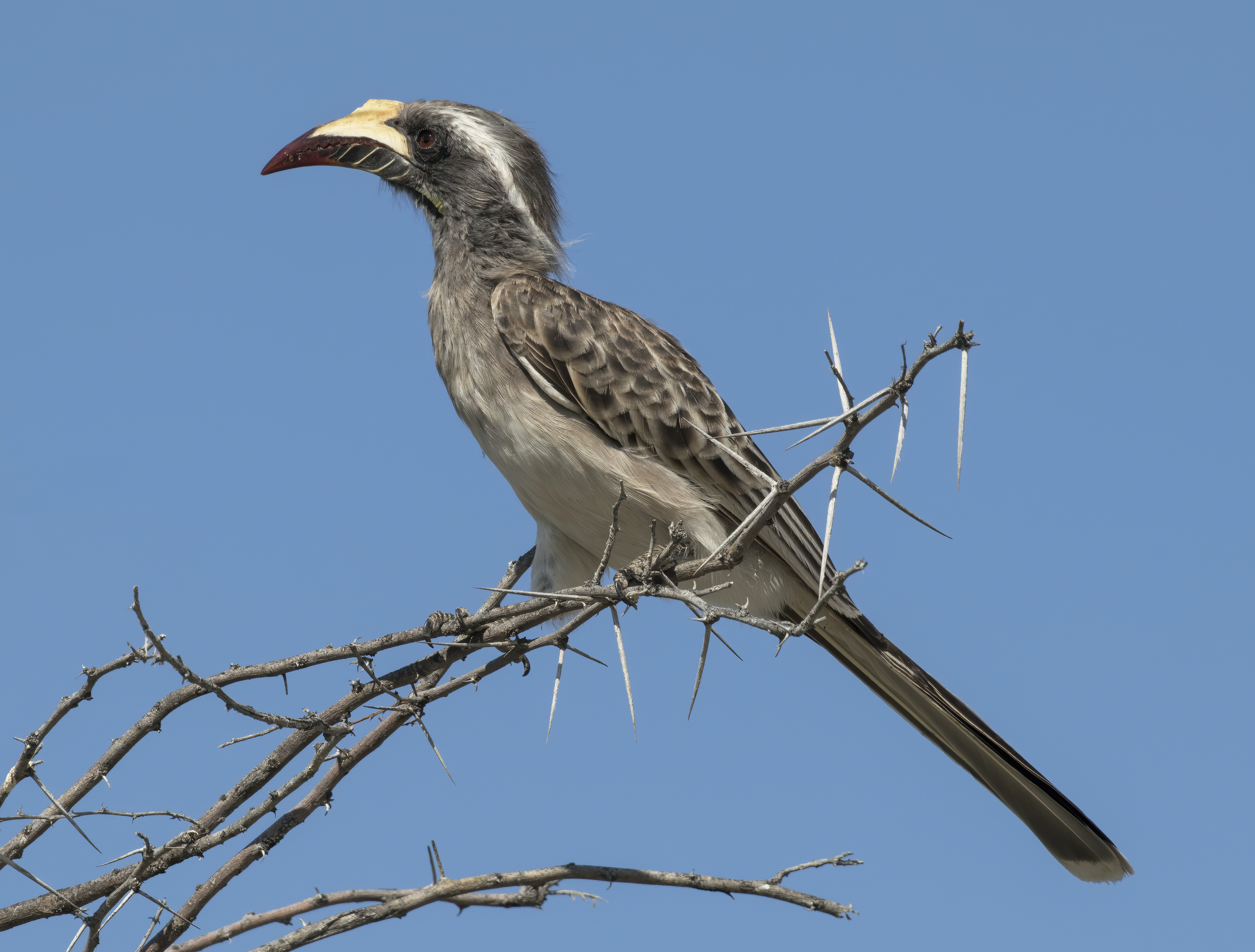
- Female L. n. epirhinus in Namibia Call of nominate subspecies, Kenya

Conservation status
- Least Concern (IUCN 3.1)

Scientific classification
- Kingdom: Animalia
- Phylum: Chordata
- Class: Aves
- Order: Bucerotiformes
- Family: Bucerotidae
- Genus: Lophoceros
- Species: L. nasutus

Binomial name
- Lophoceros nasutus (Linnaeus, 1766)
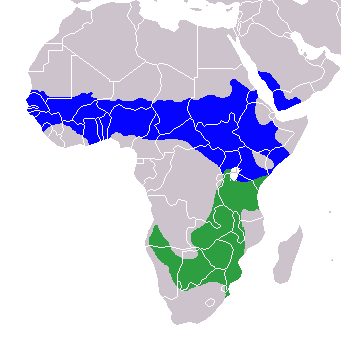
- L. n. nasutus L. n. epirhinus

Synonyms
- Buceros nasutus Linnaeus, 1766; Tockus nasutus (Linnaeus, 1766)

= African grey hornbill =

Species of bird

The African grey hornbill (Lophoceros nasutus) is a member of the hornbill family of mainly tropical birds found in the Old World. It is a widespread resident breeder in much of sub-Saharan Africa and the southwest of the Arabian Peninsula. The African grey hornbill has escaped or been deliberately released into Florida, USA, but there is no evidence that the population is breeding and may only persist due to continuing releases or escapes.

== Taxonomy ==
In 1760 the French zoologist Mathurin Jacques Brisson included a description of the African grey hornbill in the fourth volume of his Ornithologie based on a specimen collected in Senegal. He used the French name Le calao à bec noir du Sénégal and the Latin name Hydrocorax Senegalensis Melanorynchos. Although Brisson coined Latin names, these do not conform to the binomial system and are not recognized by the International Commission on Zoological Nomenclature. When in 1766 the Swedish naturalist Carl Linnaeus updated his Systema Naturae for the twelfth edition he added 240 species that had been previously described by Brisson in his Ornithologie. Linnaeus included a terse description of the African grey hornbill, placed it with the other hornbills in the genus Buceros and coined the binomial name Buceros nasutus.

The African grey hornbill is now placed in the genus Lophoceros that was introduced in 1833 by two German naturalists, Wilhelm Hemprich and Christian Gottfried Ehrenberg. This genus was resurrected in 2013 to contain a group of hornbills that had previously been placed in the genus Tockus. The genus name Lophoceros combines the Ancient Greek lophos meaning "crest" with kerōs meaning "horn". The specific epithet nasutus is from Latin and means "large-nosed".

Two subspecies are recognized:

- L. n. nasutus (Linnaeus, 1766) — Senegal and Gambia to Ethiopia, central Kenya, and southwest Arabia
- L. n. epirhinus (Sundevall, 1850) — south Uganda and south Kenya to northern South Africa

== Description ==
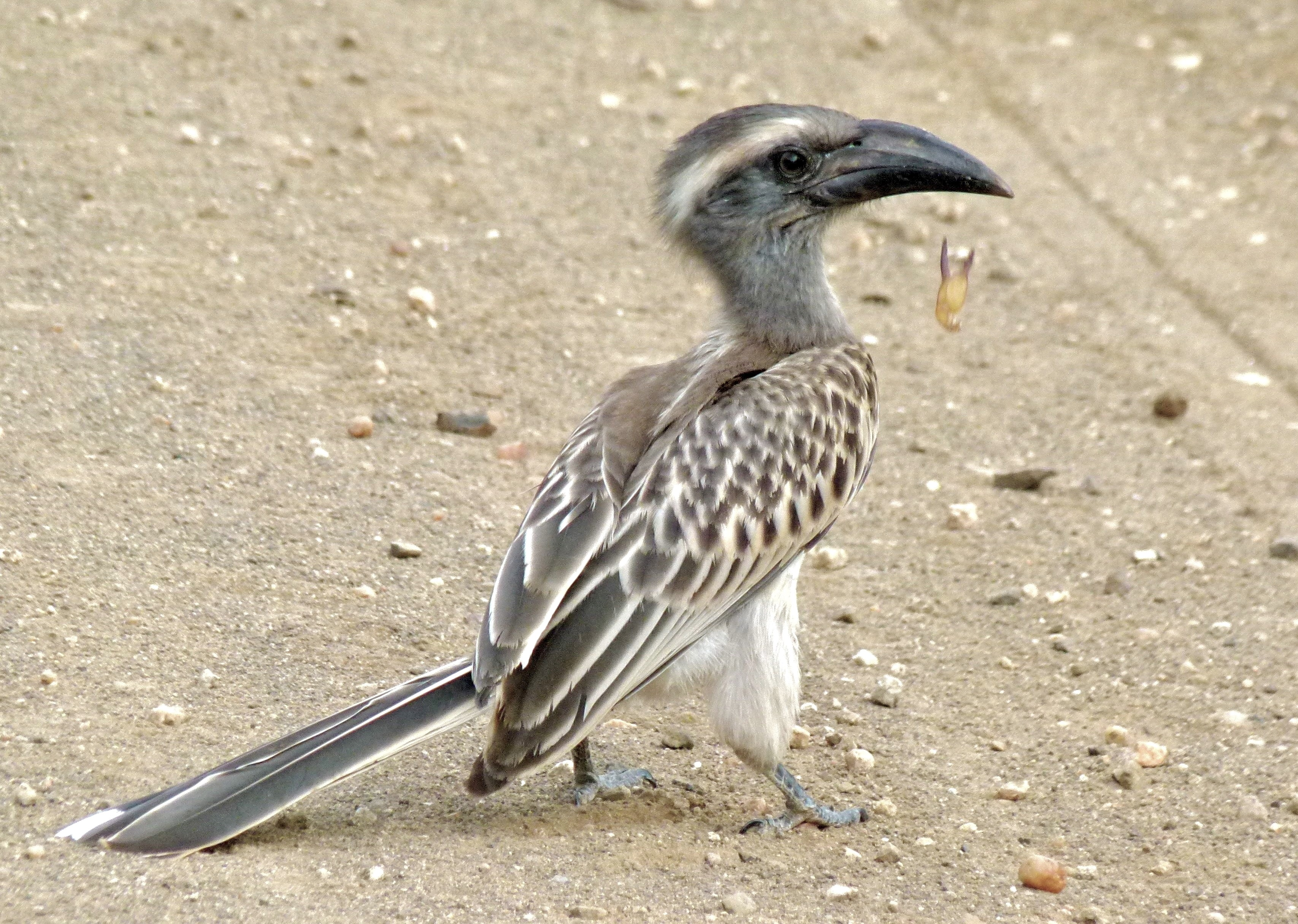
Juvenile bird (L. n. epirhinus) in the Kruger National Park, which lacks the mature bill shape and colours of adults

At 45–51 cm (18–20 in) in length, the African grey hornbill is a large bird, although it is one of the smaller hornbills. Its plumage is grey and brown, with the head, flight feathers and long tail being of a darker shade. There is a white line down each side of the crown and another down the back which is only visible in flight. Their long curved bills feature a small casque along the upper culmen, which is more prominent in males than females. A dark upper mandible with creamy-yellow mark or horizontal stripe is diagnostic of males, whereas females have tricoloured, red-tipped mandibles. The plumage of the male and female is similar. That of juveniles doesn't differ much from adults, but their bills are initially uniformly blackish. The flight is undulating. The similarly sized red-billed hornbills occur in similar savannah habitats but have pied plumage.

This conspicuous bird advertises its presence with a piping pee-o pee-o pee-o call.

== Distribution and habitat ==
African grey hornbill is widespread over much of sub-Saharan Africa. It prefers open woodland and savannah.

== Behavior and ecology ==
=== Breeding ===
The female lays two to four white eggs in a tree hollow, which is blocked off during incubation with a cement made of mud, droppings and fruit pulp. However, due to climate change, increased air temperatures can affect the reproduction of the African Grey Hornbill's likelihood to be able to hatch. There is only one narrow aperture, just large enough for the male to transfer food to the mother and the chicks. When the chicks and female outgrow the nest, the mother breaks out and rebuilds the wall, after which both parents feed the chicks.

=== Food and feeding ===
The African grey hornbill is omnivorous, taking insects, fruit and reptiles. It feeds mainly in trees.

== Gallery ==
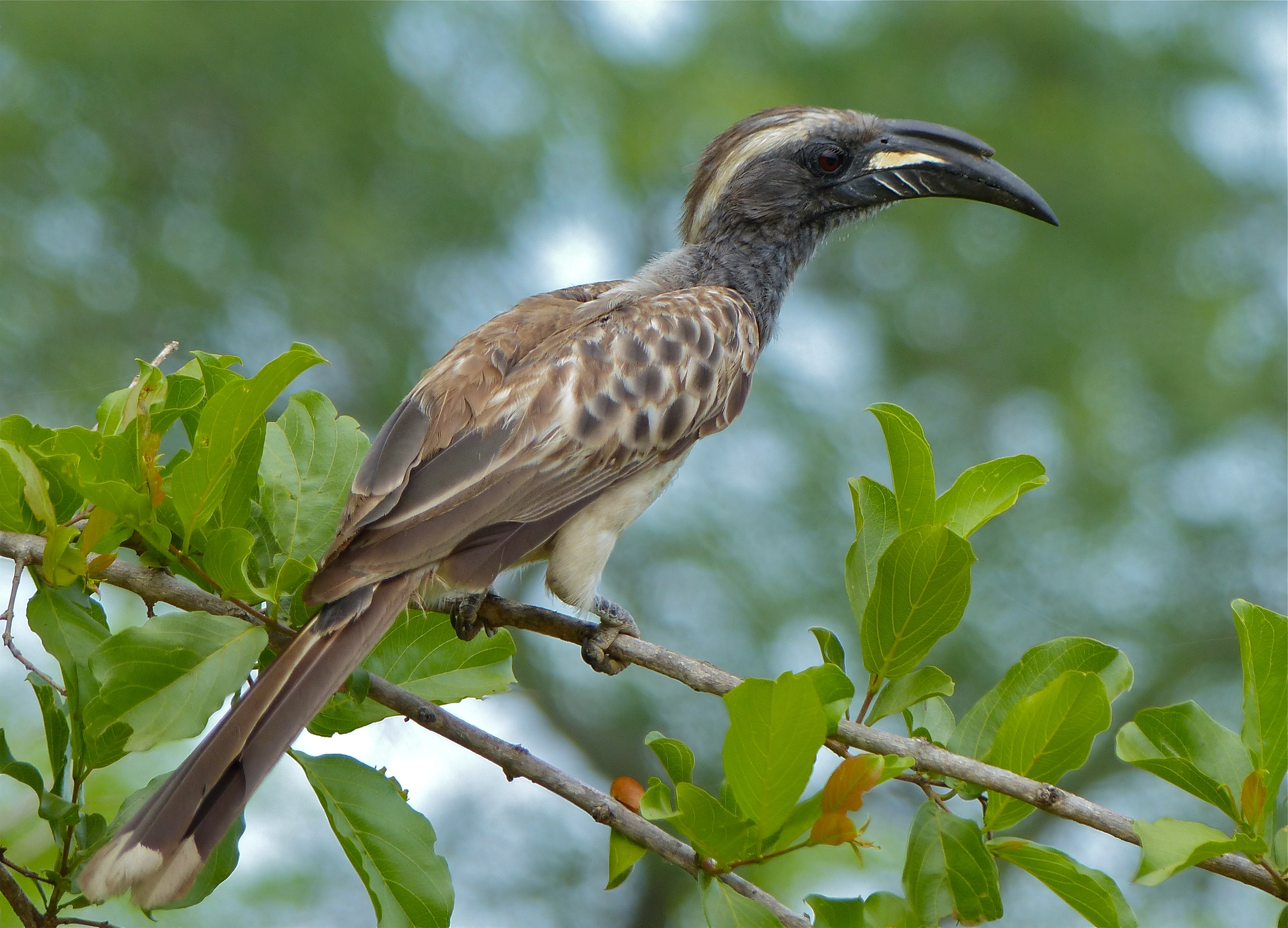
L. n. epirhinus, adult male, which has a tubular and forwards-protruding casque

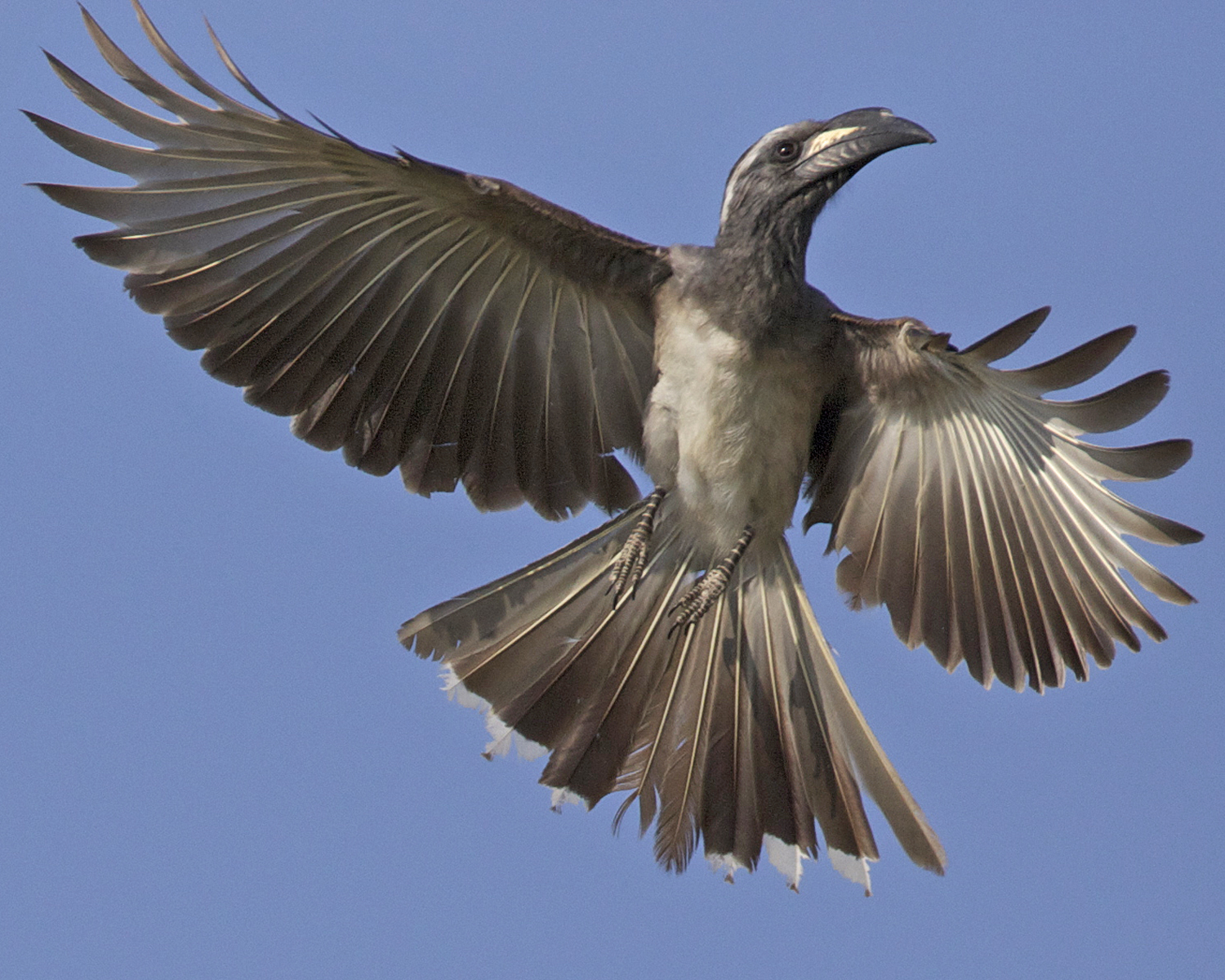
Male of the nominate race in the central Serengeti, with a ridge-like casque

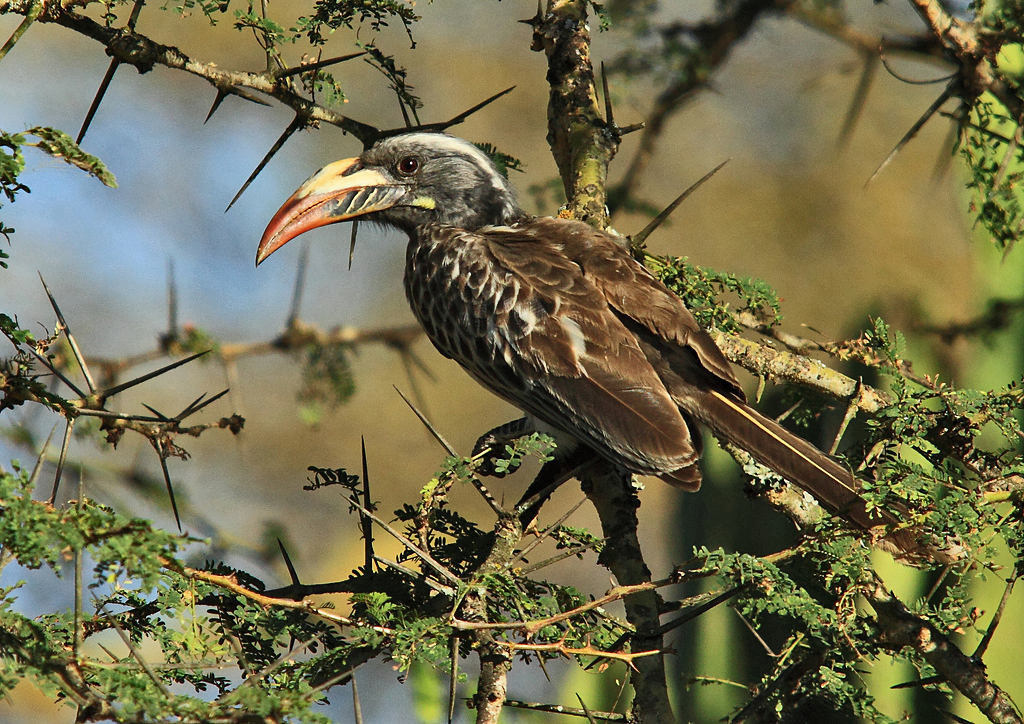
L. n. nasutus, adult female at Lake Naivasha, Kenya, with the diagnostic tricoloured bill

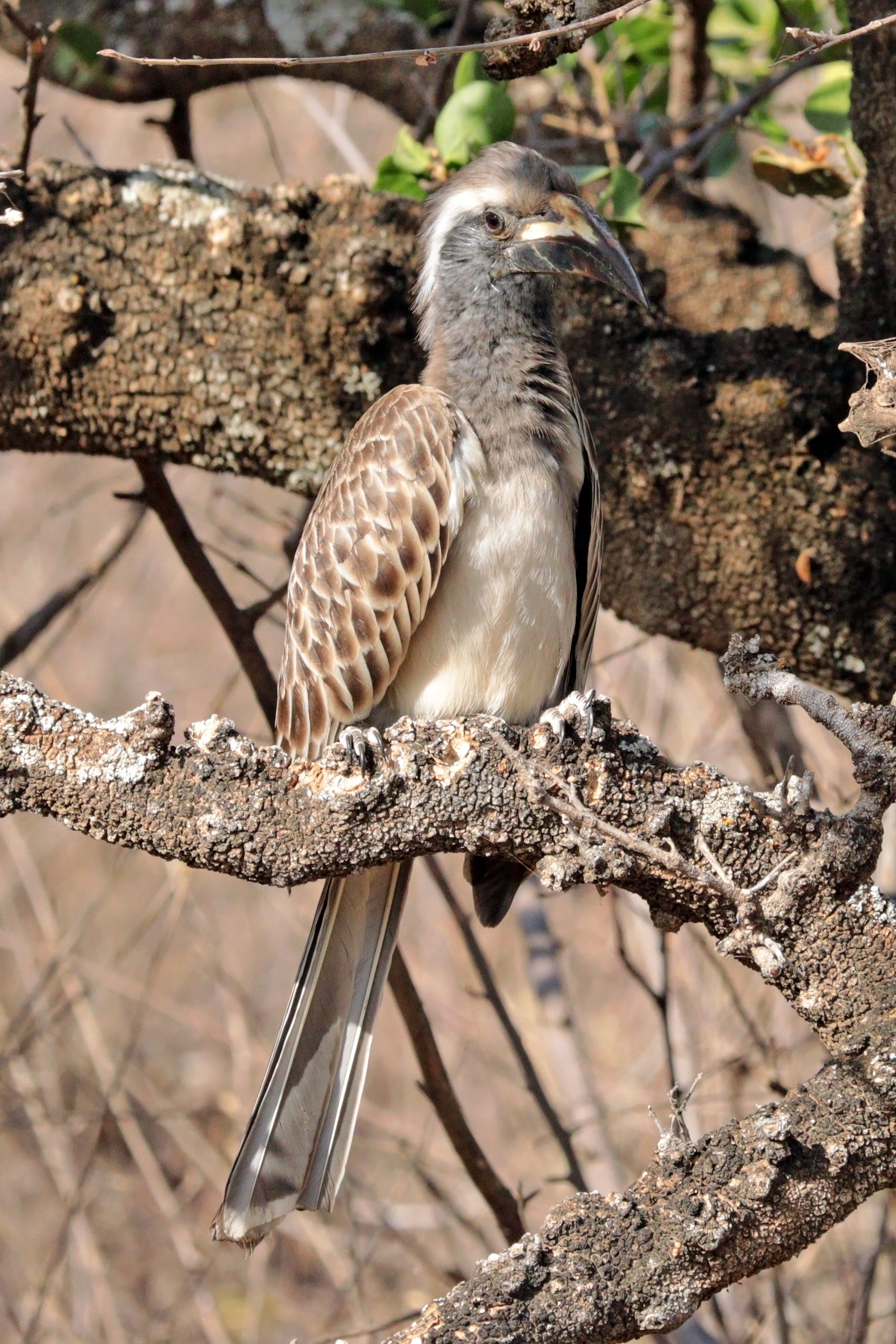
L. n. nasatus, juv. female in Ethiopia
