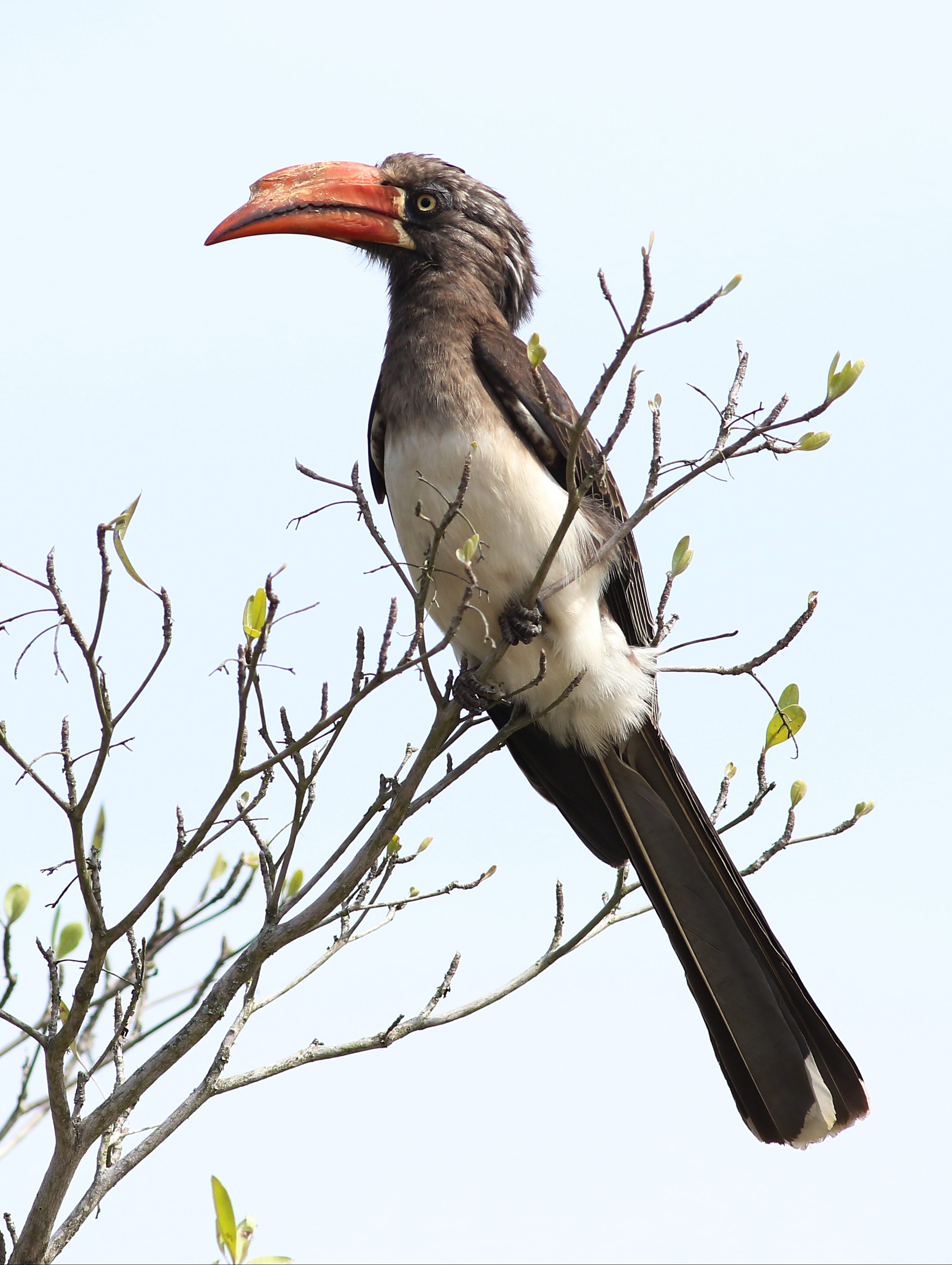
- Crowned hornbill, Lophoceros alboterminatus

Scientific classification
- Kingdom: Animalia
- Phylum: Chordata
- Class: Aves
- Order: Bucerotiformes
- Family: Bucerotidae
- Genus: Lophoceros; Hemprich & Ehrenberg, 1833

Type species
- Buceros nusutus (Linnaeus, 1766)

Species
- See text.

= Lophoceros =

Genus of birds

Lophoceros is a genus of birds in the hornbill family, Bucerotidae, which are native to Africa.

== Taxonomy ==
The genus Lophoceros was introduced in 1833 by the German naturalists Wilhelm Hemprich and Christian Gottfried Ehrenberg to accommodate Buceros, Lophoceros, forskålii. This is now considered as a junior synonym of the nominate subspecies of the African grey hornbill (Lophoceros nasutus nasutus). The genus name comes from the Ancient Greek λόφος (lóphos), meaning "crest", and κέρας (kéras), meaning "horn".

The species now placed in this genus were formerly included in the genus Tockus. A molecular phylogenetic study published in 2013 found that Tockus was divided by a deep phylogenetic split into two major groups. The genus Lophoceros was therefore resurrected to contain one of these groups.

=== Species ===
The genus contains 8 species:

Image	Scientific name	Common name	Distribution
	Lophoceros alboterminatus	Crowned hornbill	northeastern Africa
	Lophoceros bradfieldi	Bradfield's hornbill	northern Botswana, southern Angola and eastern Zimbabwe
	Lophoceros fasciatus	Congo pied hornbill	Nigeria to northern Angola and Uganda
	Lophoceros semifasciatus	West African pied hornbill	Senegal and Gambia to southern Nigeria
	Lophoceros hemprichii	Hemprich's hornbill	Djibouti, Eritrea, Ethiopia, Kenya, Somalia, South Sudan, and Uganda
	Lophoceros pallidirostris	Pale-billed hornbill	Angola, DRC, Kenya, Malawi, Mozambique, Tanzania, and Zambia.
	Lophoceros nasutus	African grey hornbill	Sub-Saharan Africa and into Arabia
	Lophoceros camurus	Red-billed dwarf hornbill	Angola, Benin, Cameroon, Central African Republic, Republic of the Congo, Democratic Republic of the Congo, Ivory Coast, Equatorial Guinea, Gabon, Ghana, Guinea, Liberia, Nigeria, Sierra Leone, South Sudan, and Uganda.
