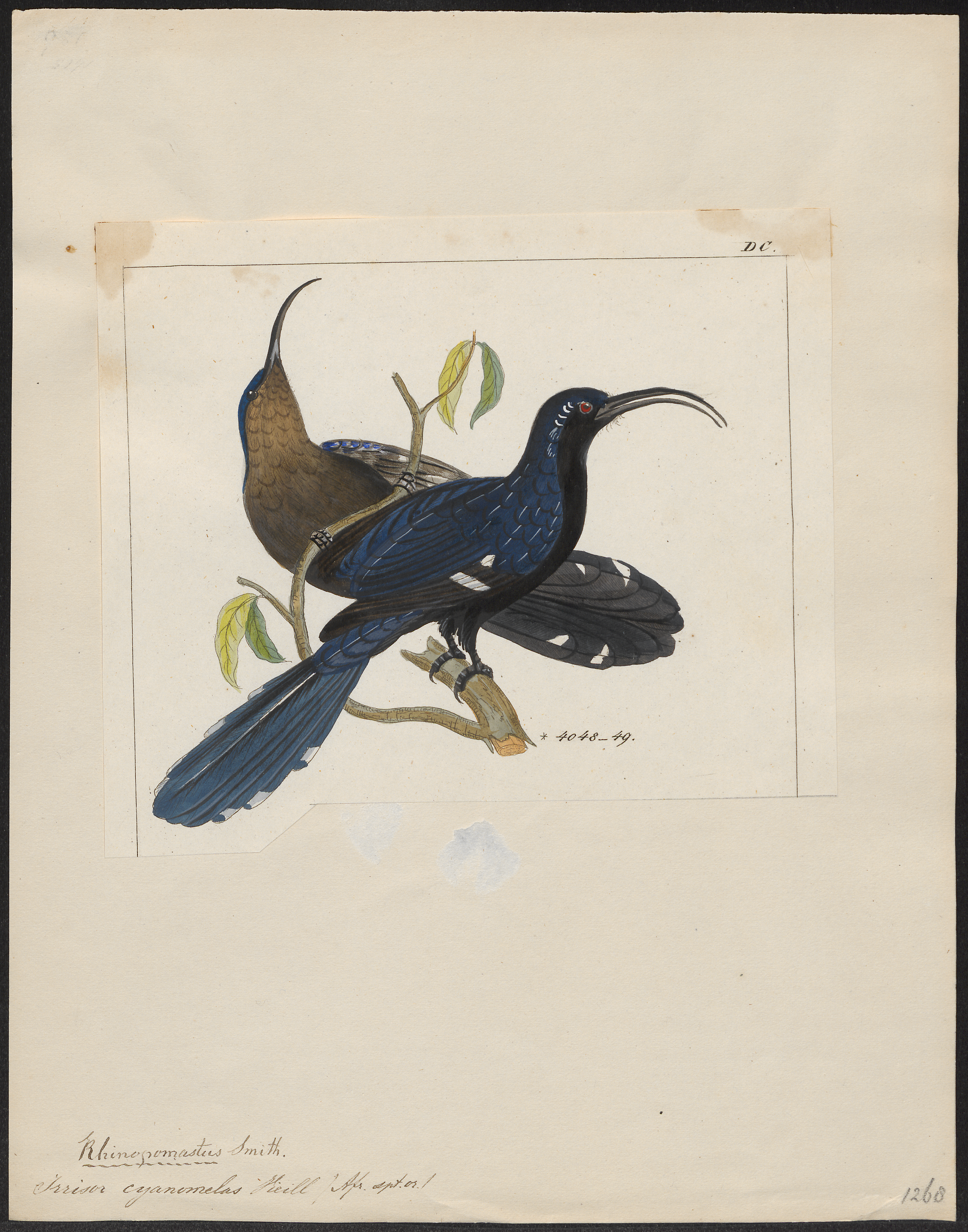
- Common scimitarbill (Rhinopomastus cyanomelas)

Scientific classification
- Kingdom: Animalia
- Phylum: Chordata
- Class: Aves
- Order: Bucerotiformes
- Family: Phoeniculidae
- Genus: Rhinopomastus; Jardine, 1828

Type species
- Rhinopomastus smithii Jardine, 1828

Species
- Rhinopomastus aterrimus; Rhinopomastus cyanomelas; Rhinopomastus minor

= Scimitarbill =

Scimitarbills

Genus of birds

Scimitarbills (also spelt scimitar-bills) are three species of African bird belonging to the genus Rhinopomastus. They are often classified in the woodhoopoe family, Phoeniculidae; however, genetic studies show that they diverged from the true woodhoopoes about 10 million years ago and so they are sometimes placed in a family of their own, the Rhinopomastidae.

They are smaller than most woodhoopoes and their bills are strongly curved like a scimitar, giving them their name. They are mostly glossy black in colour with a few white markings on the wings. While other woodhoopoes are gregarious birds which gather in flocks, the scimitarbills are usually seen alone or in pairs.

They feed mainly on insects and other invertebrates, which they find by using their bills to probe into holes and crevices. They are acrobatic birds, well-adapted for clambering through trees. The eggs are laid in a tree cavity.

== Species ==
The genus contains four species:

Image	Scientific name	Common name	Description	Distribution
	Rhinopomastus castaneiceps	Forest wood hoopoe		Cameroon, Central African Republic, Republic of the Congo, Democratic Republic of the Congo, Ivory Coast, Ghana, Guinea, Liberia, Nigeria, Rwanda, and Uganda.
	Rhinopomastus aterrimus	Black scimitarbill	less markedly curved bill than the others	Two populations, one extending from West Africa eastwards to Ethiopia and the other in Angola and adjacent countries.
	Rhinopomastus cyanomelas	Common scimitarbill	the largest and longest-tailed species and the only one with white markings on the tail.	Southern and Eastern Africa
	Rhinopomastus minor	Abyssinian scimitarbill	smaller than the others with a red bill rather than a black one.	arid scrub from Tanzania north to Somalia.

== Bibliography ==
- Christopher Perrins, ed. (2004) The New Encyclopedia of Birds, Oxford University Press, Oxford
- Ian Sinclair & Peter Ryan (2003) Birds of Africa south of the Sahara, Struik, Cape Town
