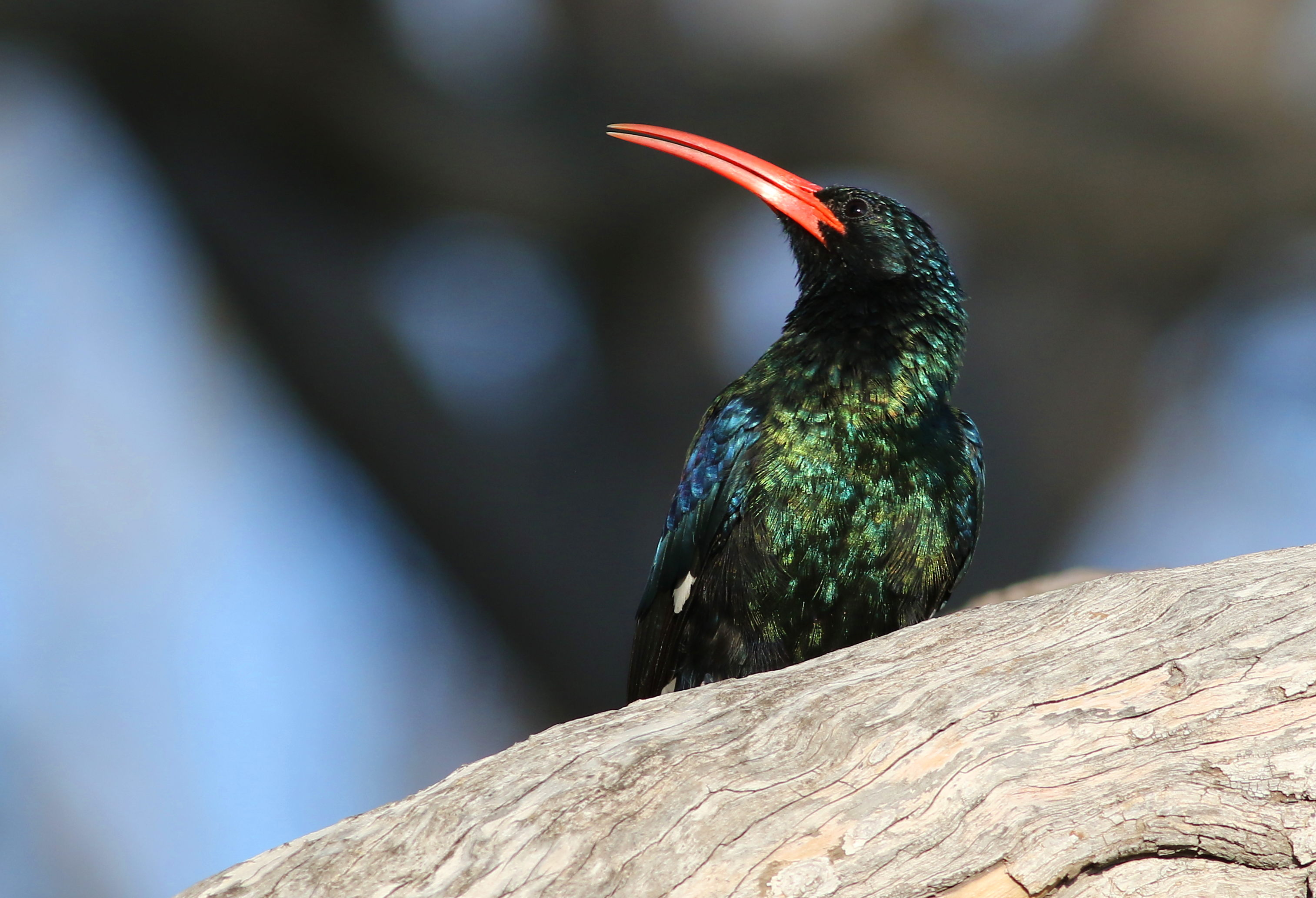
- At Mapungubwe National Park, South Africa
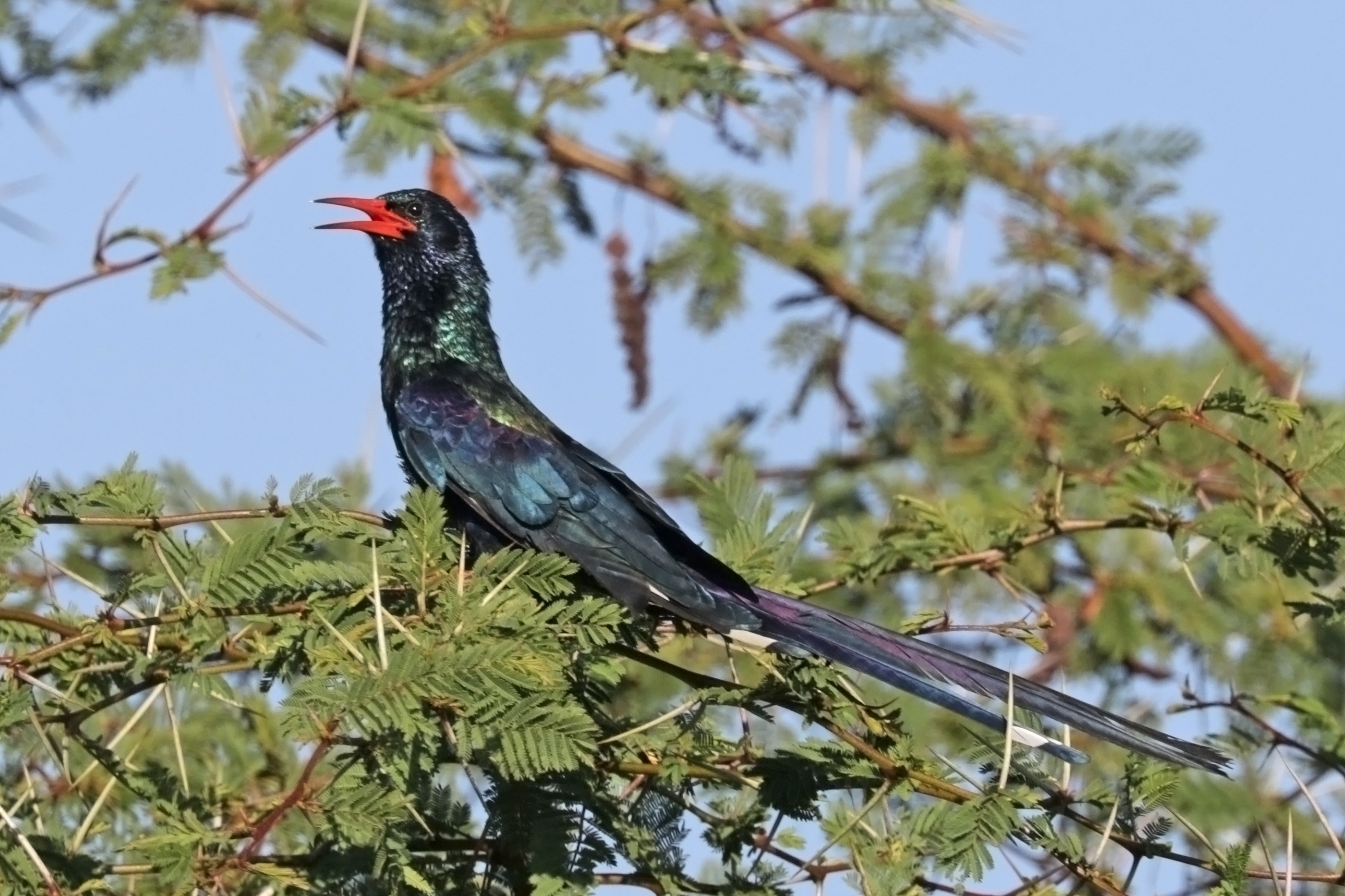
- P. p. angolensis in the Matetsi safari area of western Zimbabwe

Conservation status
- Least Concern (IUCN 3.1)

Scientific classification
- Kingdom: Animalia
- Phylum: Chordata
- Class: Aves
- Order: Bucerotiformes
- Family: Phoeniculidae
- Genus: Phoeniculus
- Species: P. purpureus

Binomial name
- Phoeniculus purpureus (J.F. Miller, 1784)

Audio
- Chattering calls of P. p. niloticus in the Mtembur area of western Kenya

= Green wood hoopoe =

Green wood-hoopoe

Species of bird

The green wood hoopoe (Phoeniculus purpureus) is a large, up to 44 cm (17 in) long tropical bird native to Africa. It is a member of the family Phoeniculidae, the wood hoopoes, and was formerly known as the red-billed wood hoopoe.

== Taxonomy ==
In 1784 the English illustrator John Frederick Miller included a hand-coloured plate of the green wood hoopoe in his Icones animalium et plantarum. He coined the binomial name Promerops purpureus and mistakenly specified the type locality as eastern India. The green wood hoopoe is now one of five species placed in the genus Phoeniculus that was introduced in 1821 by the Polish zoologist Feliks Paweł Jarocki.

The green wood hoopoe is sometimes considered as conspecific with the black-billed wood hoopoe (Phoeniculus somaliensis) and the violet wood hoopoe (Phoeniculus damarensis).

=== Subspecies ===
Six subspecies are recognised:

- P. p. senegalensis (Vieillot, 1822) – south Senegal to south Ghana
- P. p. guineensis (Reichenow, 1902) – north Senegal and Gambia to Chad and Central African Republic
- P. p. niloticus (Neumann, 1903) – Sudan to west Ethiopia and northeast DR Congo
- P. p. marwitzi (Reichenow, 1906) – east Uganda and Kenya to east South Africa
- P. p. angolensis (Reichenow, 1902) – Angola and west Zambia to northeast Namibia and north Botswana
- P. p. purpureus (Miller, JF, 1784) – central, southwest South Africa

== Description ==
This abundant species is a metallic dark green, with a purple back and very long diamond-shaped purple tail. Distinctive white markings on the wings and white chevrons on the tail edges make it easily identifiable, as does its long, thin, curved red bill. Sexes are similar, but immatures have a black bill.

It advertises its presence with its loud kuk-uk-uk-uk-uk call and other vocalisations.

== Behaviour and ecology ==
=== Food and foraging ===
The green wood hoopoe is an insect-eating species. It feeds mainly on the ground, at termite mounds, or on tree trunks, and forms flocks outside the breeding season. Its specialised claws enable it to cling easily to the underside of branches while closely inspecting the bark for insects.

=== Reproduction ===
The green wood hoopoe is a cooperative breeder and common resident in the forests, woodlands and suburban gardens of most of sub-Saharan Africa. It is found in groups of up to a dozen or so birds with only one breeding pair. The breeding female lays two to four blue eggs in a natural tree hole or old barbet nest and incubates them for about 18 days. On hatching, she and the nestlings are fed by the rest of the group, even after they have fledged and left the nest hole. The group is fearless in defence of the nestlings against intruders. This species is parasitised by the greater and lesser honeyguide.

== Status ==
Widespread and common throughout its large range, the green wood hoopoe is assessed as Least Concern on the IUCN Red List of Threatened Species.

== Gallery ==
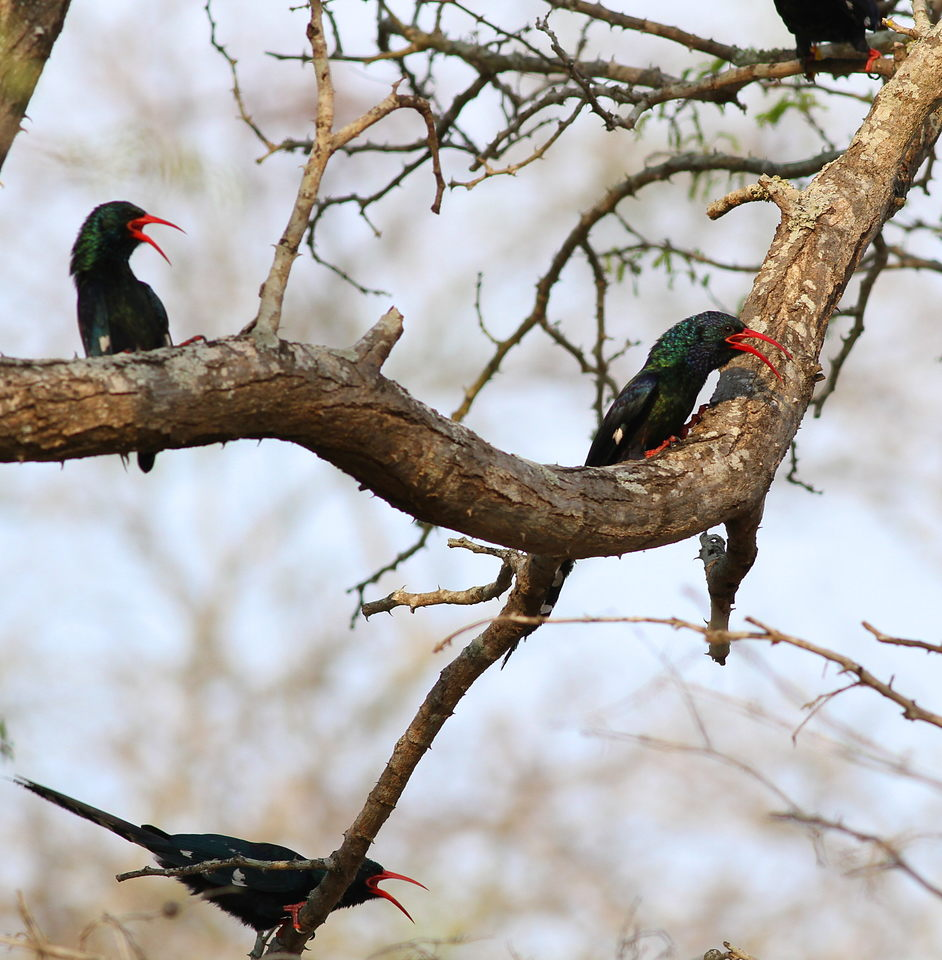
Chattering family group

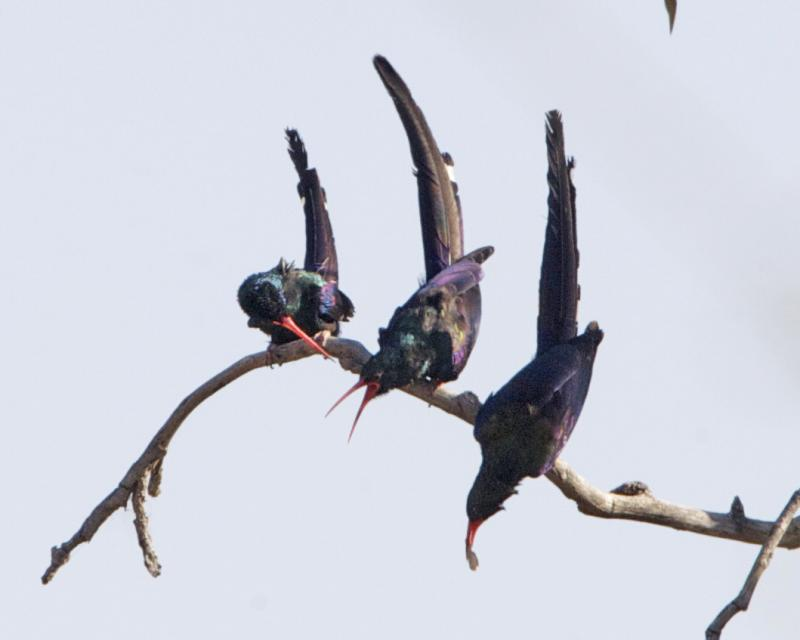
Chattering and displaying

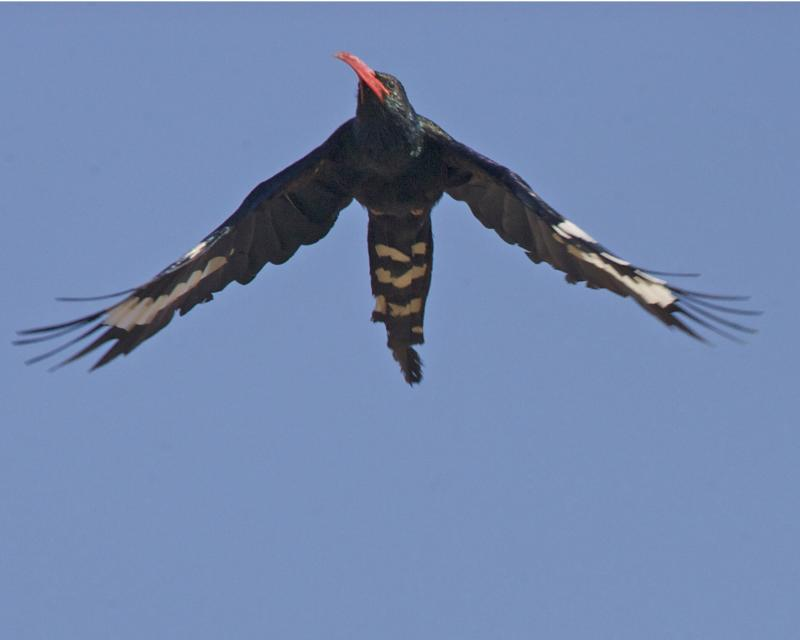
In flight

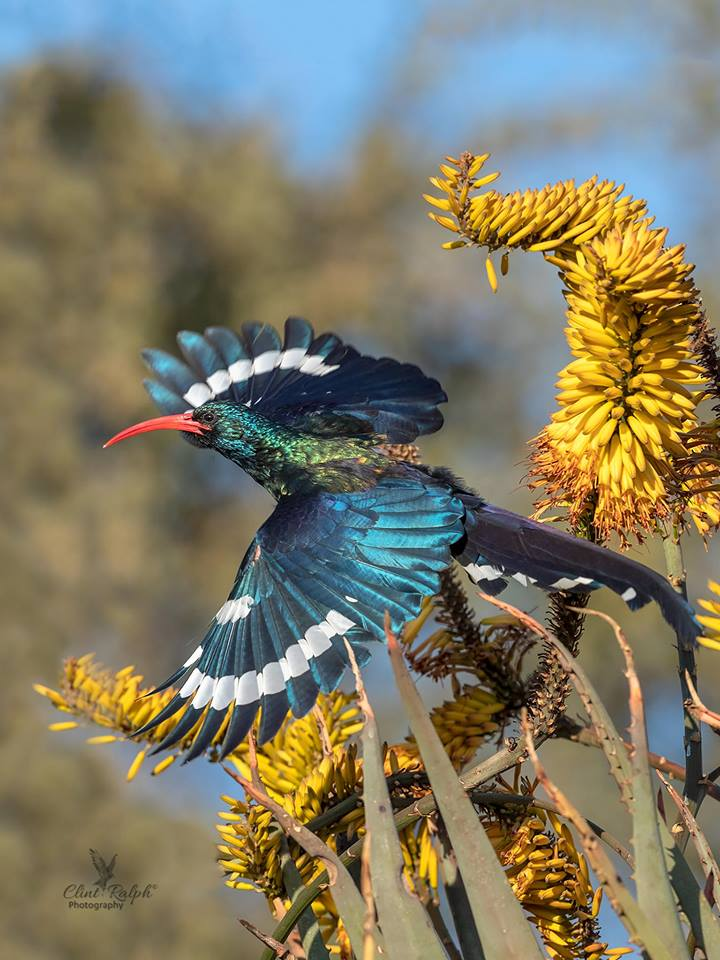
Feeding at aloe flowers in winter

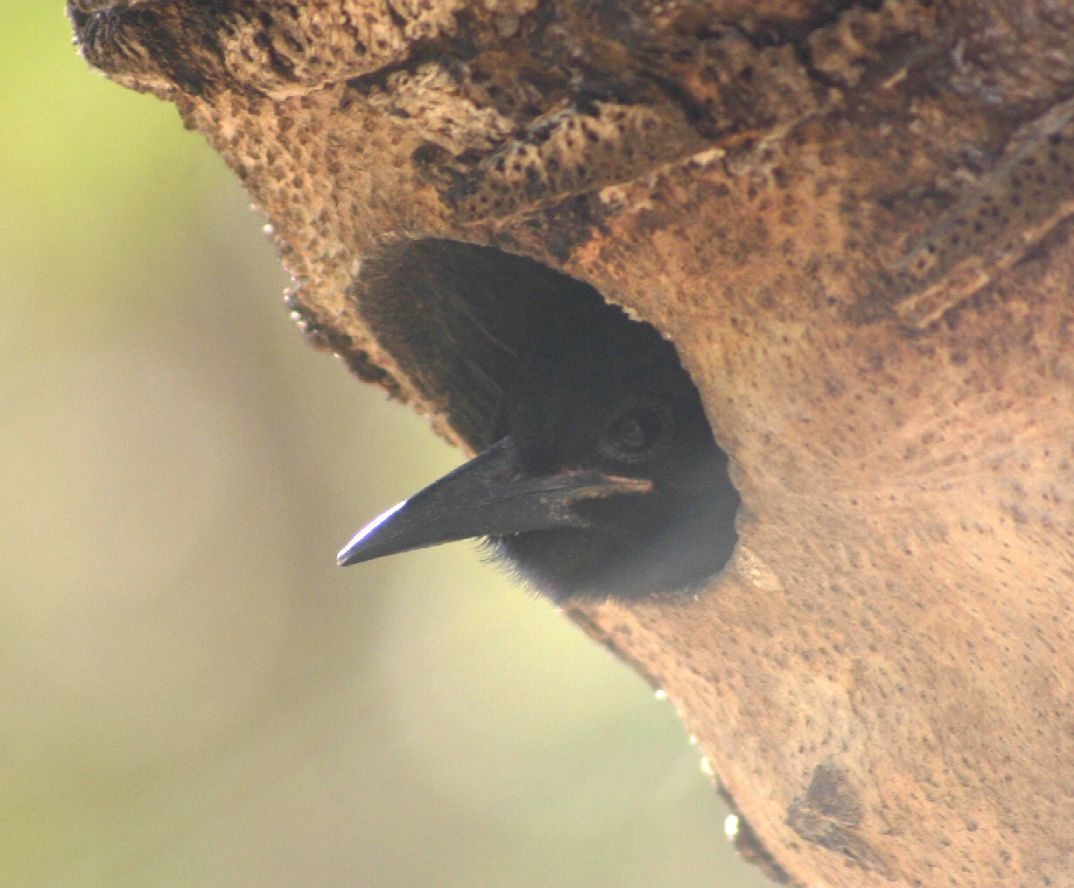
Immature fledgling with black bill peeking from old barbet hole

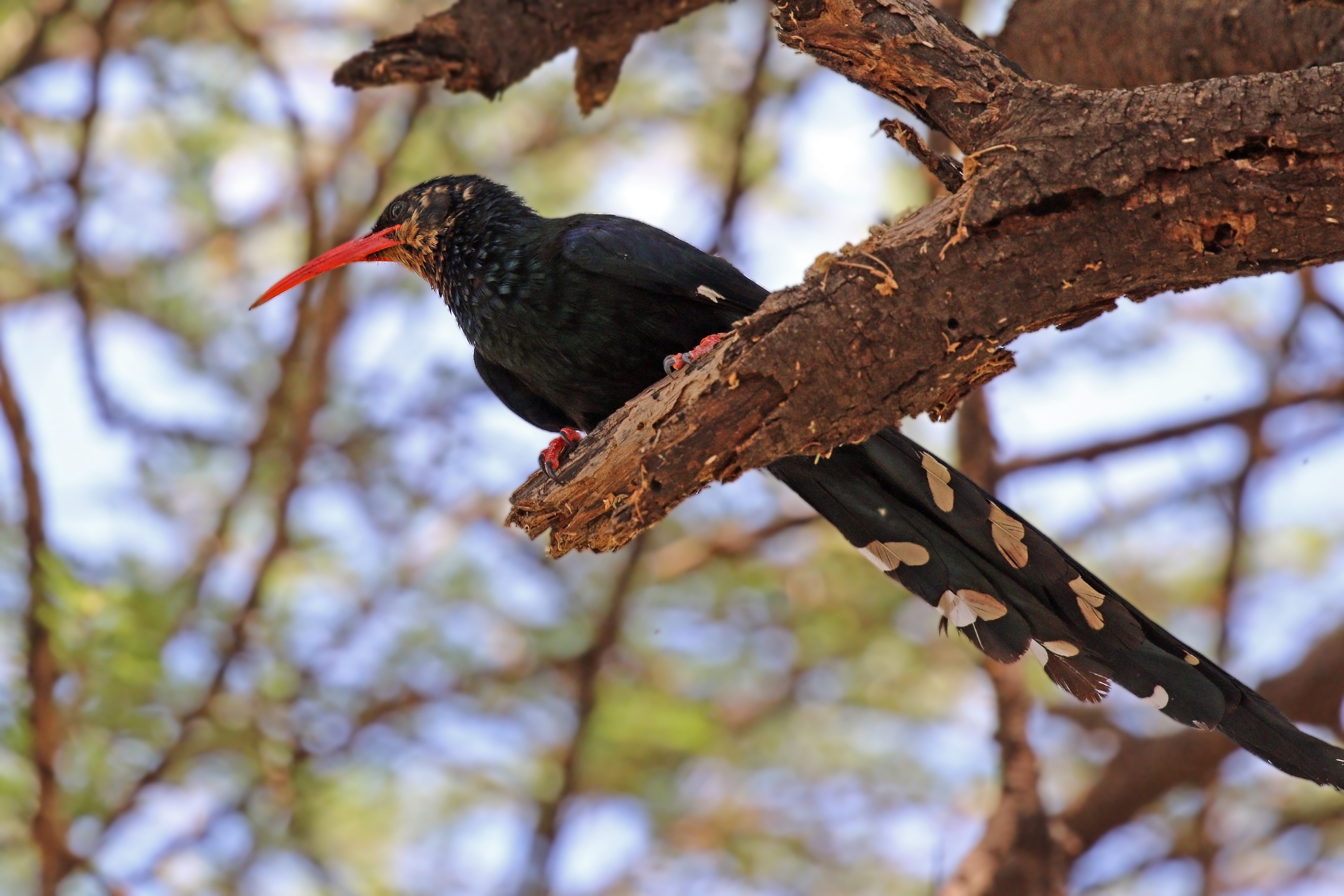
P. p. niloticus at Lake Baringo, Kenya
