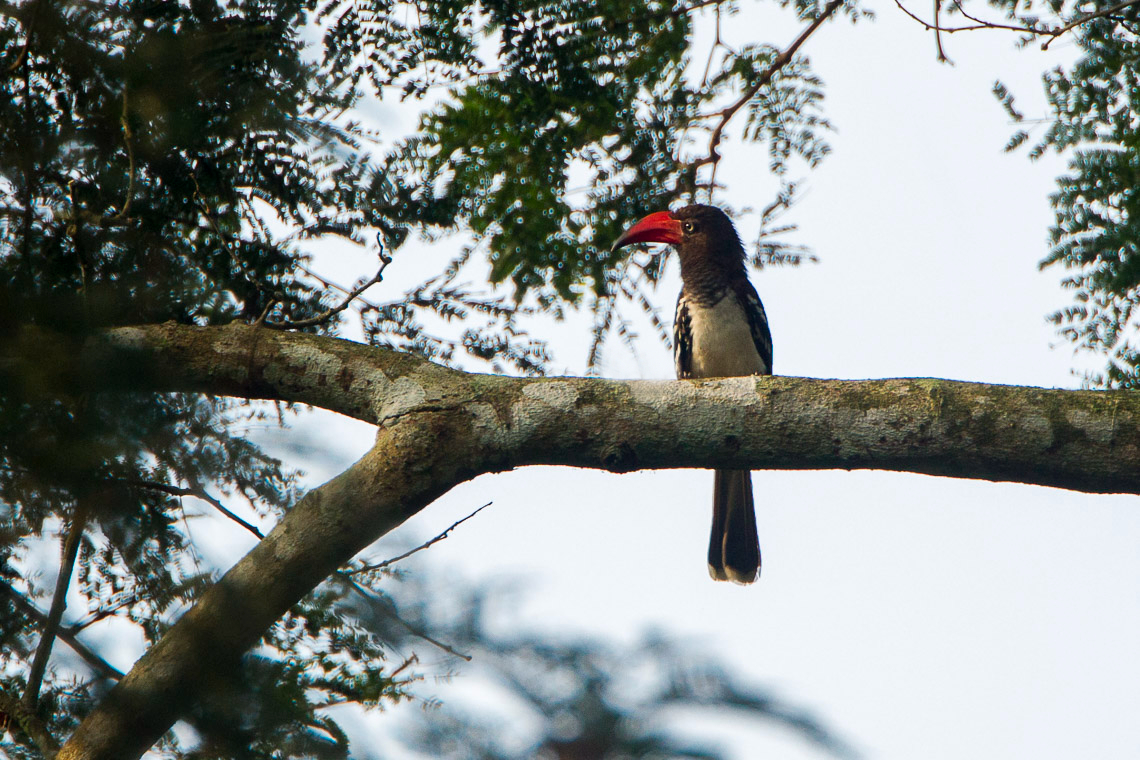

Conservation status
- Least Concern (IUCN 3.1)

Scientific classification
- Kingdom: Animalia
- Phylum: Chordata
- Class: Aves
- Order: Bucerotiformes
- Family: Bucerotidae
- Genus: Lophoceros
- Species: L. camurus

Binomial name
- Lophoceros camurus (Cassin, 1857)
- Range

Synonyms
- Tockus camurus

= Red-billed dwarf hornbill =

Species of bird

The red-billed dwarf hornbill (Lophoceros camurus) is a species of hornbill in the family Bucerotidae. It is distributed across the African tropical rainforest.
