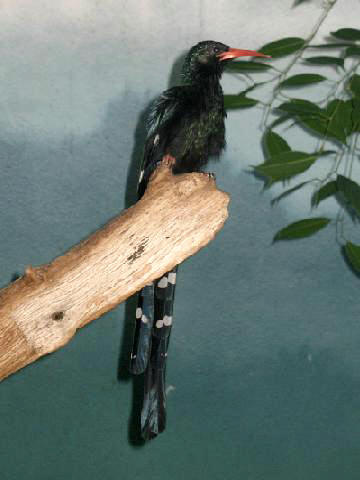
- Green wood hoopoe (P. purpureus)

Scientific classification
- Kingdom: Animalia
- Phylum: Chordata
- Class: Aves
- Order: Bucerotiformes
- Family: Phoeniculidae
- Genus: Phoeniculus; Jarocki, 1821

Type species
- Upupa erythrorhynchus Latham, 1790

= Phoeniculus =

Genus of birds

Phoeniculus is a genus of bird in the family Phoeniculidae. They are restricted to sub-Saharan Africa.

== Taxonomy ==
The genus Phoeniculus was introduced in 1821 by the Polish zoologist Feliks Paweł Jarocki with Upupa erythrorhynchus (Latham) (the green wood hoopoe) as the type species. The genus name is a diminutive of the Ancient Greek φοινιξ/phoinix, φοινικος/phoinikos, the phoenix.

The genus contains the following 4 species:

Image	Scientific name	Common name	Distribution
	Phoeniculus bollei	White-headed wood hoopoe	Burundi, Cameroon, Central African Republic, Democratic Republic of the Congo, Ivory Coast, Ghana, Guinea, Kenya, Liberia, Mali, Nigeria, Rwanda, South Sudan, Tanzania, and Uganda.
	Phoeniculus damarensis	Violet wood hoopoe	Angola, Kenya, Namibia, and Tanzania.
	Phoeniculus somaliensis	Black-billed wood hoopoe	Djibouti, Eritrea, Ethiopia, Kenya, Somalia, Sudan and South Sudan
	Phoeniculus purpureus	Green wood hoopoe	Sub-Saharan Africa.

Members of this genus have long, slightly down-curved, pointed bills with stout bases. Most spend the day in flocks of 5 to 12 birds, acrobatically climbing in trees or hanging underneath branches, sticking their bills into crevices in search of insects and other small arthropods. They may brace themselves with their long tails as woodpeckers do, but the tail feathers are not stiff like woodpeckers' and wear easily. Though their feet are strong, their floppy and bounding flight is weak and not sustained long. They are noisy and may take breaks from foraging to engage in a "rally": they "cackle" or "chuckle" together and rock back and forth, the wings half opened, the tail oscillating up and down. This ceremony helps keep the group together.

In adult green wood hoopoes (Phoeniculus purpureus), males exhibit a notable sexual dimorphism with bills that are 36% longer than those of females. This characteristic is not attributed to sexual selection or reproductive roles, but rather to ecological separation, which minimizes foraging competition among the sexes.

The groups consist largely of parents, helpers, and young. Helpers are birds that, instead of breeding, help another pair defend the nest and feed the young. This practice improves reproductive success. The helpers may breed the following year; as a result of the bonds they formed with the young they helped, the latter may become their helpers in turn.
