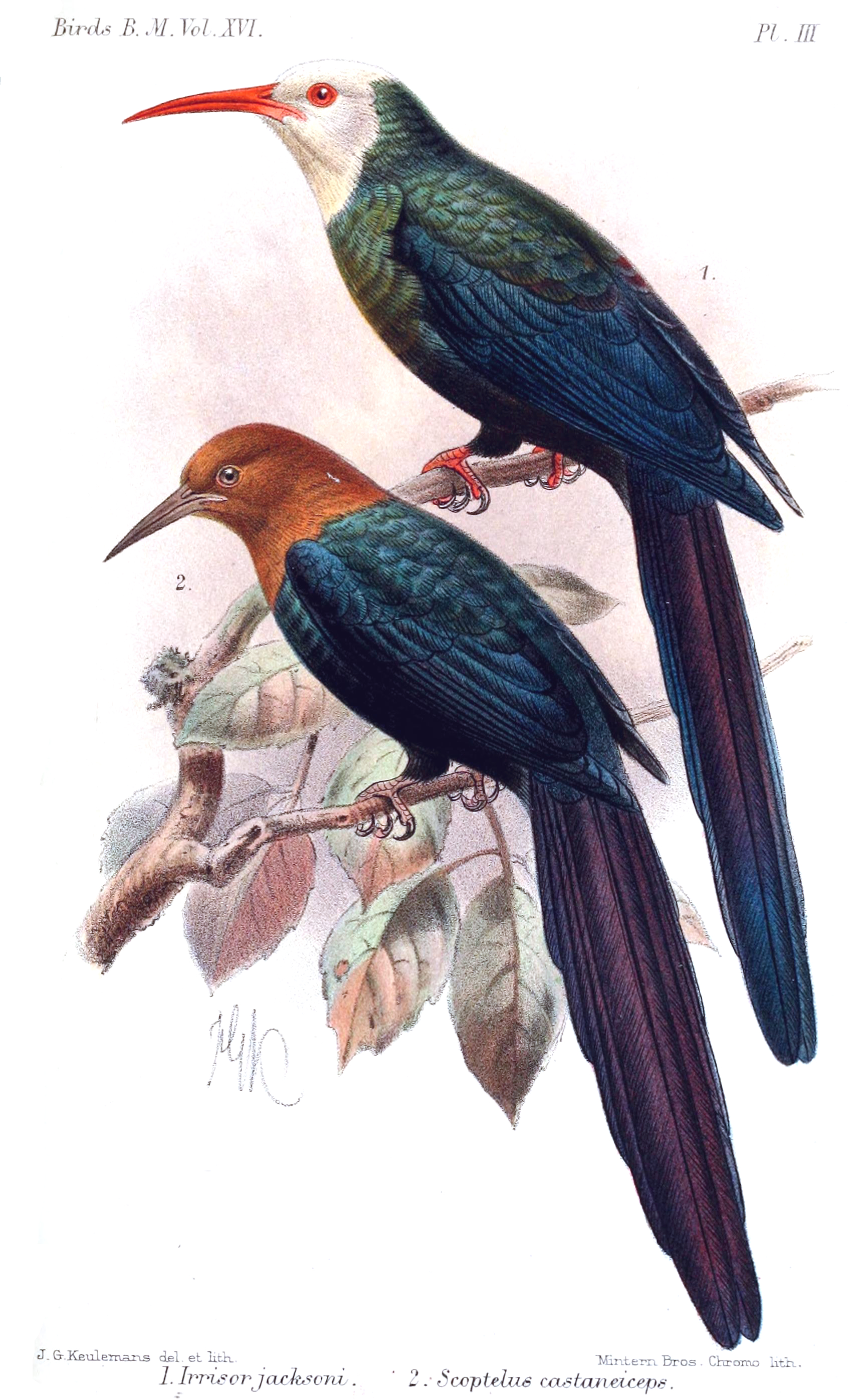
- Forest wood hoopoe (bottom), illustration by Keulemans, 1892

Conservation status
- Least Concern (IUCN 3.1)

Scientific classification
- Kingdom: Animalia
- Phylum: Chordata
- Class: Aves
- Order: Bucerotiformes
- Family: Phoeniculidae
- Genus: Rhinopomastus
- Species: R. castaneiceps

Binomial name
- Rhinopomastus castaneiceps (Sharpe, 1871)

Synonyms
- Scoptelus castaneiceps; Phoeniculus castaneiceps; Irrisor castaneiceps

= Forest wood hoopoe =

Species of bird

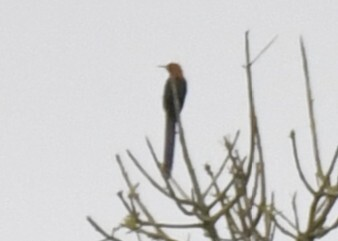
On branch

The forest wood hoopoe (Rhinopomastus castaneiceps) is a species of bird in the family Phoeniculidae. It is found in Cameroon, Central African Republic, Republic of the Congo, Democratic Republic of the Congo, Ivory Coast, Ghana, Guinea, Liberia, Nigeria, Rwanda, and Uganda.
