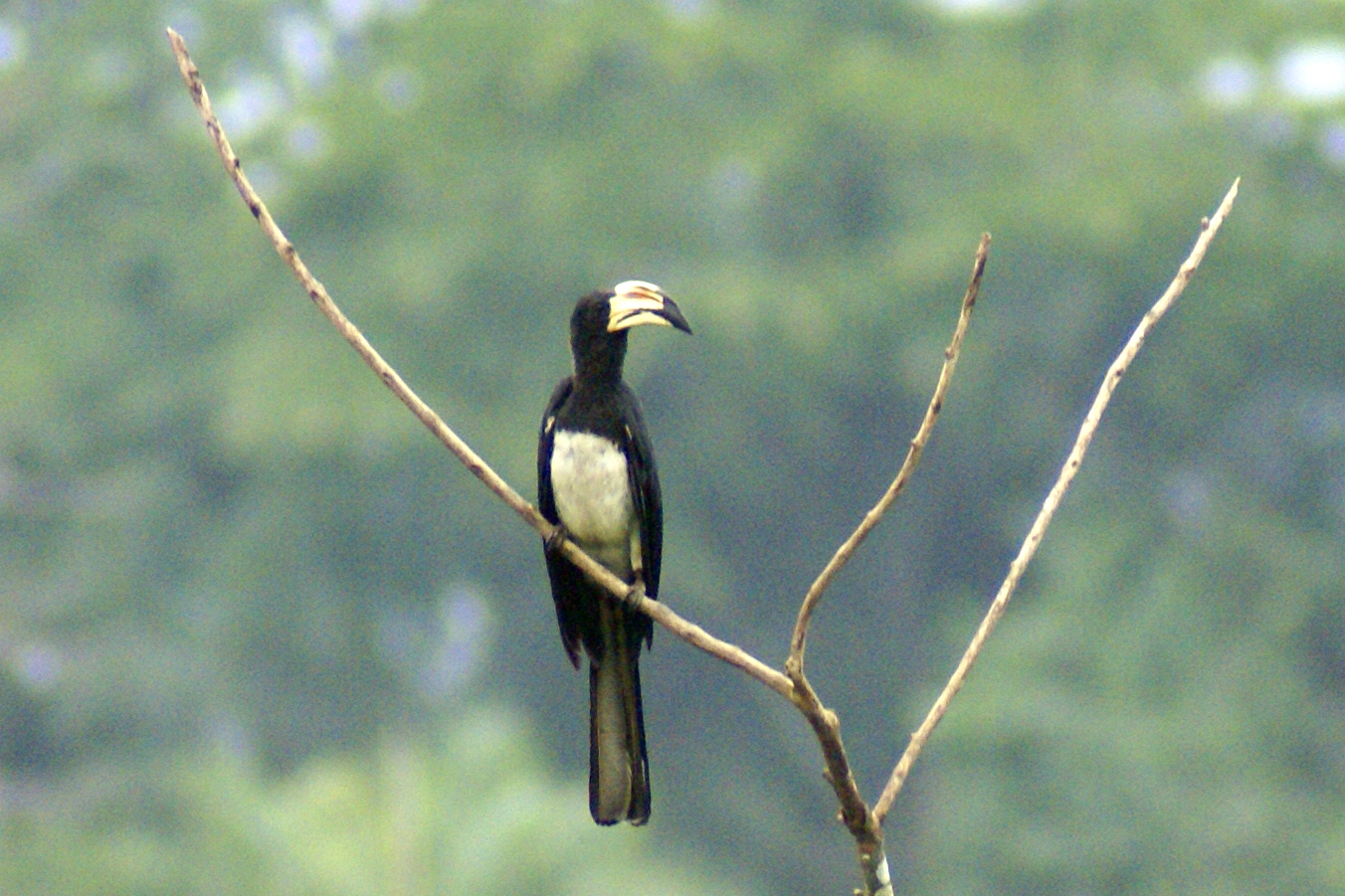

Conservation status
- Least Concern (IUCN 3.1)

Scientific classification
- Kingdom: Animalia
- Phylum: Chordata
- Class: Aves
- Order: Bucerotiformes
- Family: Bucerotidae
- Genus: Lophoceros
- Species: L. fasciatus

Binomial name
- Lophoceros fasciatus (Shaw, 1812)
- Range

Synonyms
- Tockus fasciatus

= Congo pied hornbill =

Species of bird

The Congo pied hornbill (Lophoceros fasciatus) is a bird of the hornbill family, a family of tropical birds found in the Old World.

The Congo pied hornbill is native to the Congo Basin. This is a bird of mainly forest habitats. The female lays up to four white eggs in a tree hole, which is blocked off during incubation with a cement made of mud, droppings and fruit pulp. There is only one narrow aperture, just big enough for the male to transfer food to the mother and the chicks.

== Morphology ==
This is a large bird, 54 centimetres (21 in) in length. It has mainly black plumage, with white belly and tail tip. The long, curved black and yellow bill has a medium-sized casque. The sexes are similar, but the female has a smaller casque. Immature birds are duller, have a smaller bill, and no casque. The flight is undulating.

== Behaviour ==
The Congo pied hornbill is omnivorous and eats fruit and insects. It feeds mainly in trees and is attracted to oil palms.

This conspicuous and gregarious bird advertises its presence with its whistling pii-pii-pii-pii- call.

When the chicks and the female are too big to fit in the nest, the mother breaks out and rebuilds the wall. Then both parents feed the chicks.
