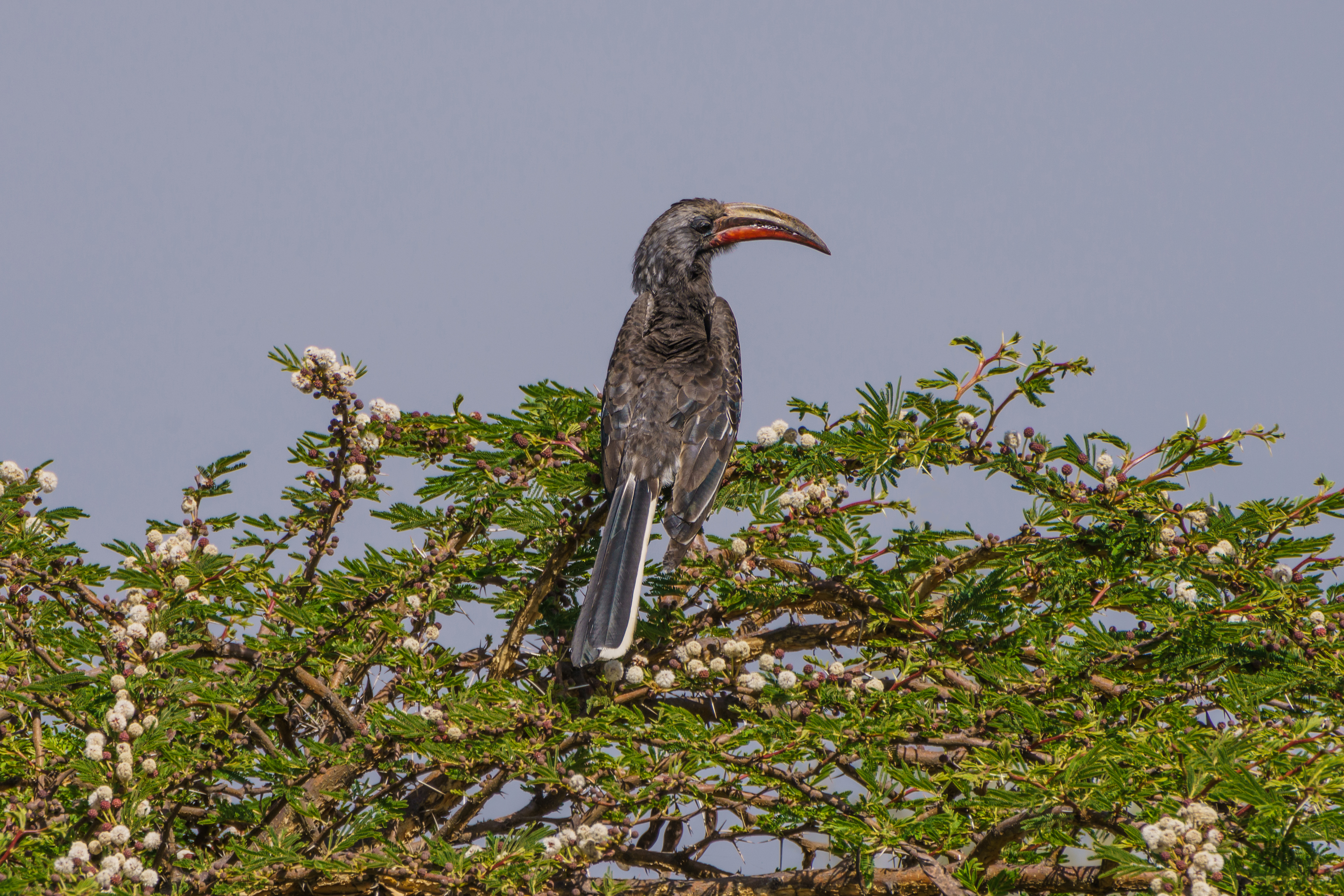
- In Ethiopia

Conservation status
- Least Concern (IUCN 3.1)

Scientific classification
- Kingdom: Animalia
- Phylum: Chordata
- Class: Aves
- Order: Bucerotiformes
- Family: Bucerotidae
- Genus: Lophoceros
- Species: L. hemprichii

Binomial name
- Lophoceros hemprichii (Ehrenberg, 1833)
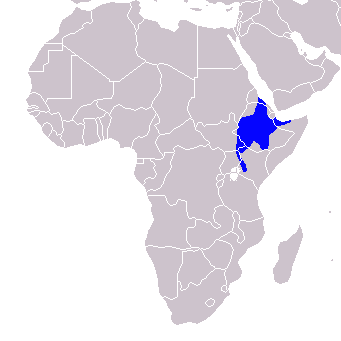

Synonyms
- Tockus hemprichii

= Hemprich's hornbill =

Species of bird

Hemprich's hornbill (Lophoceros hemprichii) is a species of hornbill in the family Bucerotidae. It is found in Djibouti, Eritrea, Ethiopia, Kenya, Somalia, South Sudan, and Uganda.

== Habitat ==
As observed in the Degua Tembien district of north Ethiopia, the bird is found in bushland, scrubland and dense secondary forest, often near cliffs, gorges or water.
