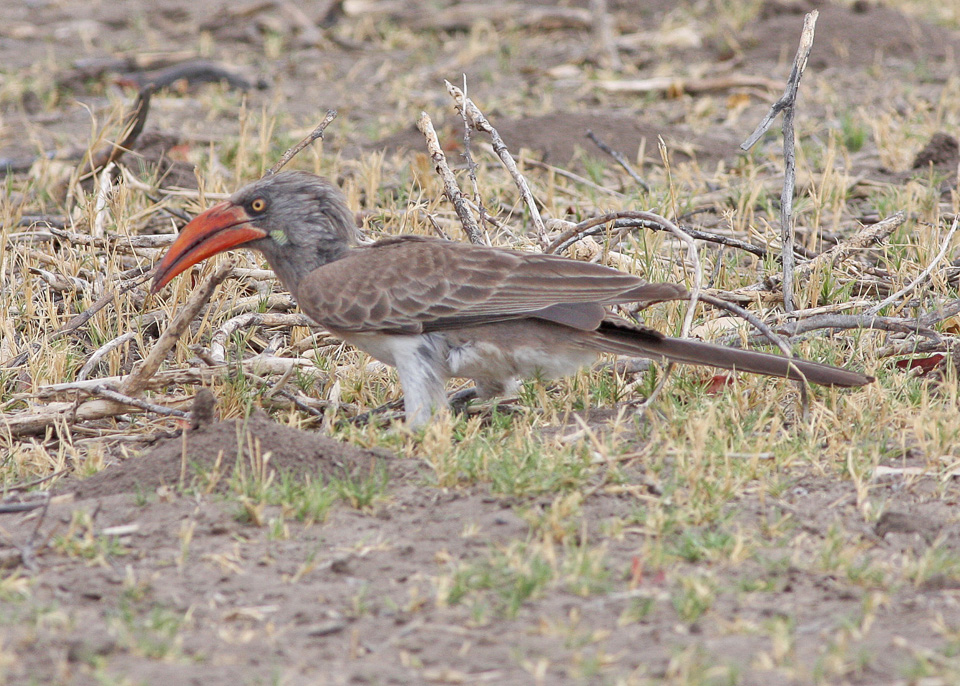

Conservation status
- Least Concern (IUCN 3.1)

Scientific classification
- Kingdom: Animalia
- Phylum: Chordata
- Class: Aves
- Order: Bucerotiformes
- Family: Bucerotidae
- Genus: Lophoceros
- Species: L. bradfieldi

Binomial name
- Lophoceros bradfieldi (Roberts, 1930)
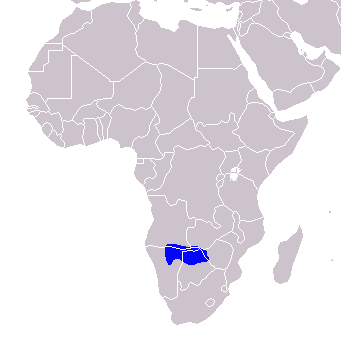
- Distribution of Bradfield's hornbill

Synonyms
- Tockus bradfieldi

= Bradfield's hornbill =

Species of bird

Bradfield's hornbill (Lophoceros bradfieldi) is an African hornbill. It is a medium-sized bird, 50–57 cm (20–22 in) in length, characterized by black back and wings and a white belly. The tip feathers of the long tail are white. Females are smaller than males and can be recognized by turquoise facial skin. The eyes are yellow and the beak is red. The beak is long and presents no casque.

This is an uncommon resident of the mopane woodlands and mixed thorn fields of northeastern Namibia (especially on the Waterberg plateau), northern Botswana, southern Angola and eastern Zimbabwe. They feed on fruits, large insects, nuts and small reptiles.

The common name and Latin binomial commemorate the South African naturalist R. D. Bradfield (1882-1949).
