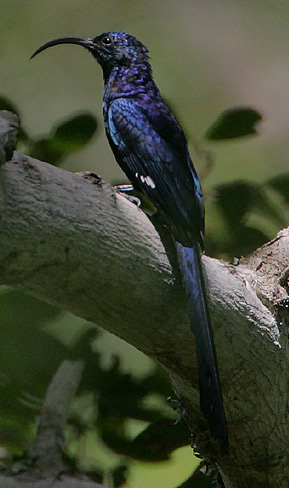

Conservation status
- Least Concern (IUCN 3.1)

Scientific classification
- Kingdom: Animalia
- Phylum: Chordata
- Class: Aves
- Order: Bucerotiformes
- Family: Phoeniculidae
- Genus: Rhinopomastus
- Species: R. cyanomelas

Binomial name
- Rhinopomastus cyanomelas (Vieillot, 1819)

= Common scimitarbill =

Species of bird

The common scimitarbill (Rhinopomastus cyanomelas) is a species of bird in the family Phoeniculidae. It is found in Angola, Botswana, Burundi, Democratic Republic of the Congo, Eswatini, Kenya, Malawi, Mozambique, Namibia, Rwanda, Somalia, South Africa, Tanzania, Uganda, Zambia, and Zimbabwe.

== Description ==
Adults weigh roughly 35 grams and 26 cm in length. As adults, their beaks are black but as juveniles, their beaks are grey. Females and juveniles are more brown on the front of their body. They feed almost entirely on insects behind the bark of a tree, which is the reason for their probing beak.

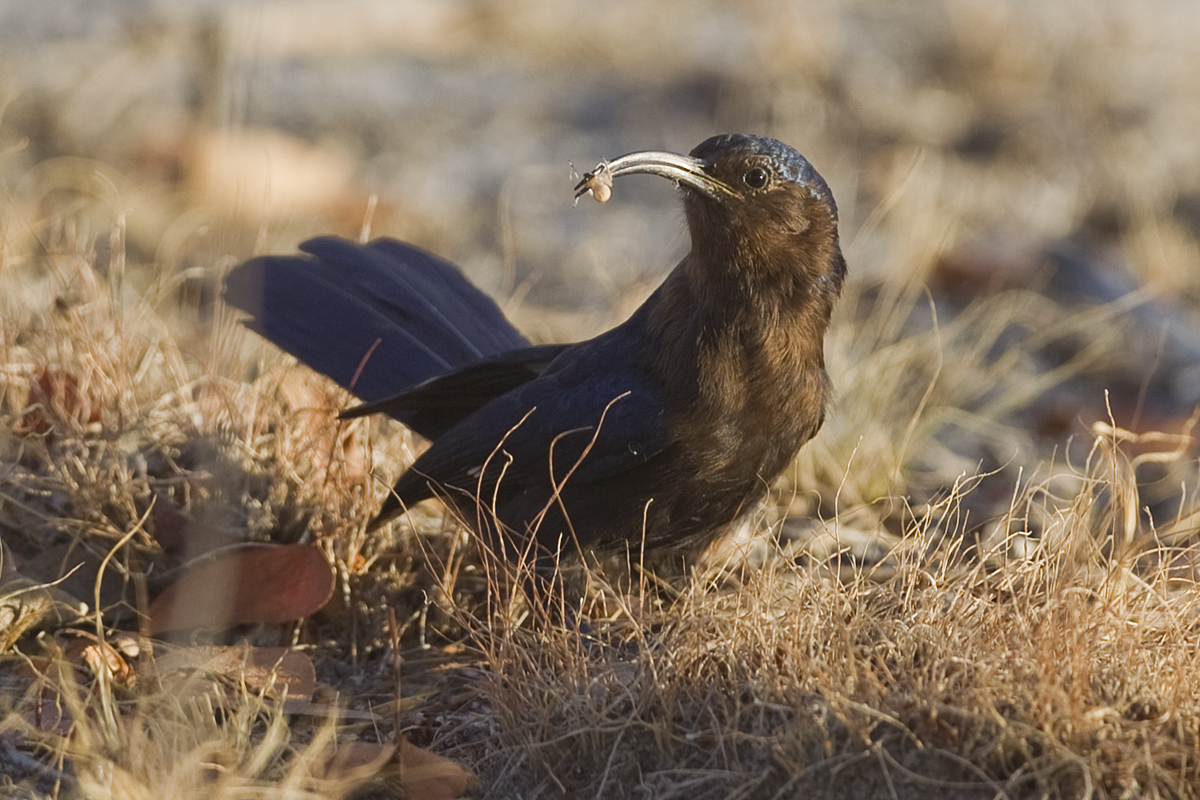
Juvenile in Etosha National Park
