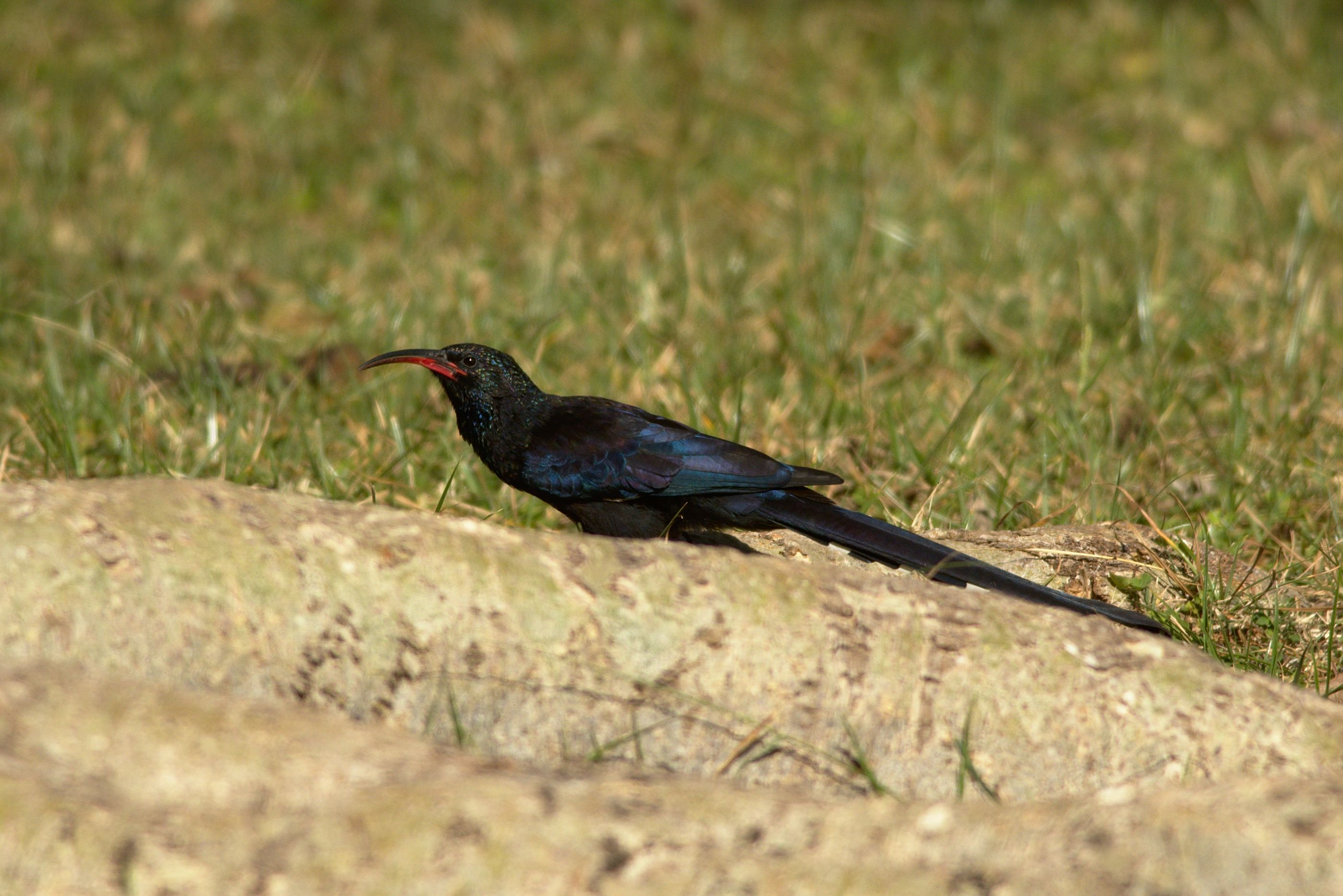
- A Black-billed Wood-hoopoe in Bishangari Lodge, Ethiopia

Conservation status
- Least Concern (IUCN 3.1)

Scientific classification
- Kingdom: Animalia
- Phylum: Chordata
- Class: Aves
- Order: Bucerotiformes
- Family: Phoeniculidae
- Genus: Phoeniculus
- Species: P. somaliensis

Binomial name
- Phoeniculus somaliensis (Ogilvie-Grant, 1901)

= Black-billed wood hoopoe =

Species of bird

The black-billed wood hoopoe (Phoeniculus somaliensis) is a species of bird in the family Phoeniculidae. It is native to eastern Africa where it is found in wooded and scrubby areas.

== Description ==
The black-billed wood hoopoe is very similar to the green wood hoopoe (Phoeniculus purpureus) in appearance, but lacks the greenish gloss on the head and mantle and has a black beak rather than a red one, though there is sometimes a reddish tinge at the base of the beak. The sexes are similar and the adult bird is about 37 cm (15 in) long. The plumage is generally black with a bluish or purplish gloss, and a row of white spots on the flight feathers giving a white bar on the wings in flight. The long, graduated tail has white spots at the edge.

== Distribution and habitat ==
It is found in eastern Africa, its range including Djibouti, Eritrea, Ethiopia, Kenya, Somalia, Sudan and South Sudan at altitudes of up to about 2,000 m (6,600 ft). It is a bird of woodland, scrubby areas, forest edges, and gallery forests, and among large trees such as Acacias growing in wadis.

== Ecology ==
The black-billed wood hoopoe feeds on arthropods, millipedes, beetles and other invertebrates, foraging on trunks and branches by creeping along the bark, sometimes upside-down, and probing into crevices. It breeds in holes in trees.

== Status ==
The black-billed wood hoopoe is a common bird and has a very wide range. Its population trend has not been quantified but it may be decreasing because the large trees in which it nests are becoming more scarce as a result of being harvested. No other particular threats to this bird are known and the International Union for Conservation of Nature has assessed its conservation status as being of "least concern".
