= List of hornbills =

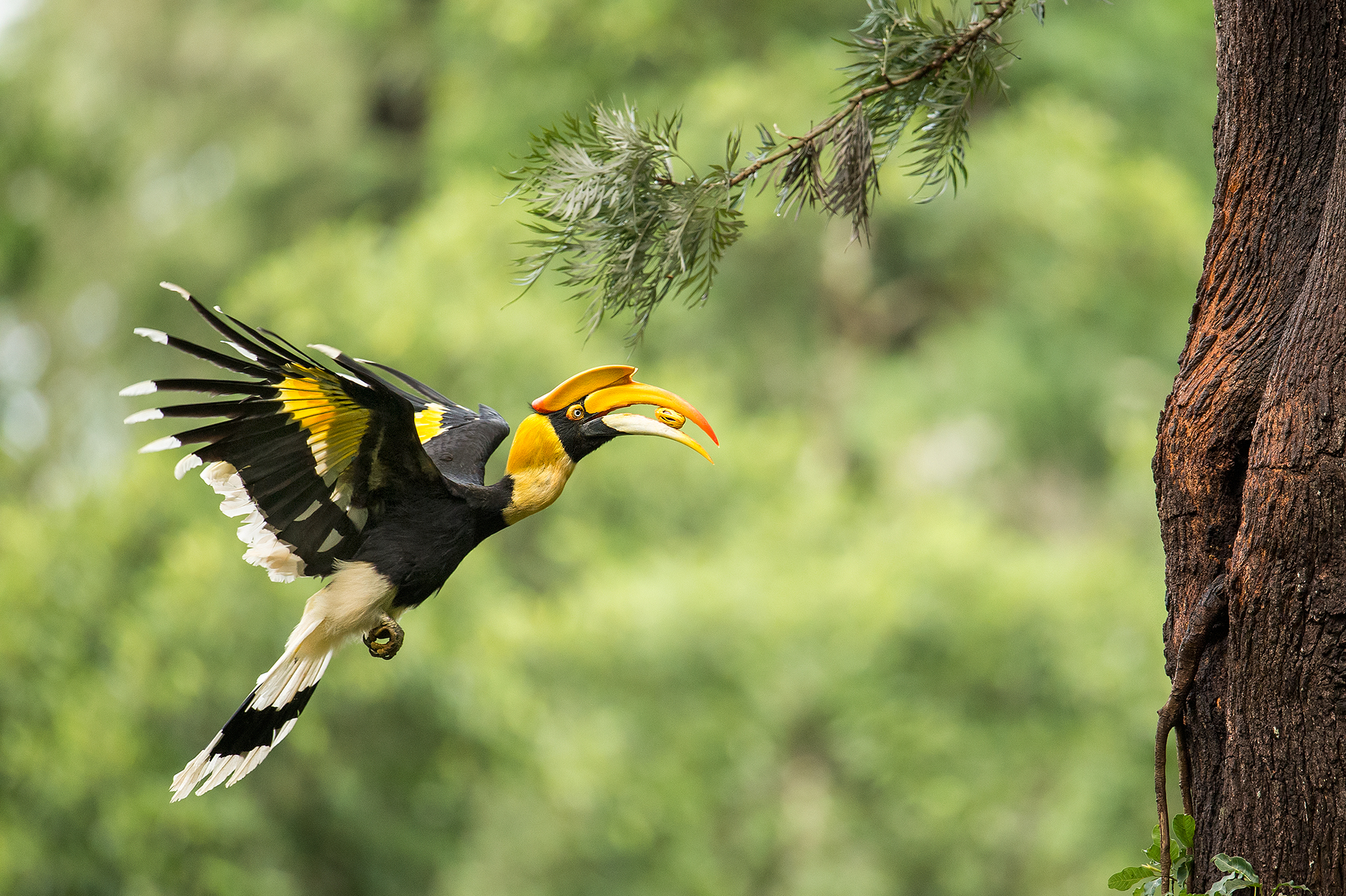
Female great hornbill

Hornbills are birds in the families Bucerotidae (the arboreal hornbills) and Bucorvidae (the ground hornbills), which are characterised by their large bills. Hornbills are found in tropical Asia and Africa, and most live in tropical and sub-tropical forests, or savannahs. Hornbills usually have casques on their beaks and colourful feathers. Arboreal hornbills nest in tree cavities, in which females seal themselves during incubation. Hornbills are mostly carnivorous, though they also consume fruits.

Most hornbill species have declining populations. African hornbill species are threatened by habitat loss, logging, hunting, and climate change. Two species are considered critically endangered, six are endangered, seventeen are vulnerable, six are near threatened, and thirty-one are of least concern. The species with the smallest estimated population is the critically endangered Sulu hornbill, estimated to number fewer than fifty mature individuals. The species with the largest estimated population is the vulnerable Palawan hornbill, which numbers up to fifty thousand mature individuals.

The number of extant hornbill species is around sixty, though the exact number is disputed due to taxonomic disagreements. As of 2026, the International Ornithologists' Union recognises sixty-four extant species in sixteen genera. Bucorvidae contains two species in one genus and Bucerotidae contains sixty-two species in fifteen genera. The hornbills are most closely related to hoopoes (Upupidae) and wood hoopoes (Phoeniculidae). These families comprise the order Bucerotiformes. Species of fossil hornbills are known from the Miocene onward, however, the fossil record of the taxon is poor.

== Conventions ==
IUCN Red List categories
Conservation status
- EX: Extinct (0 species)
- EW: Extinct in the wild (0 species)
- CR: Critically endangered (2 species)
- EN: Endangered (6 species)
- VU: Vulnerable (17 species)
- NT: Near threatened (6 species)
- LC: Least concern (31 species)

Conservation status codes listed follow the International Union for Conservation of Nature (IUCN) Red List of Threatened Species. Range maps are provided wherever possible; if a range map is not available, a description of the hornbill's range is provided. Ranges are based on the IOC World Bird List for that species unless otherwise noted. Population estimates are of the number of mature individuals and are taken from the IUCN Red List.

This list follows the taxonomic treatment (designation and order of species) and nomenclature (scientific and common names) of version 15.1 of the IOC World Bird List. Where the taxonomy proposed by the IOC World Bird List conflicts with the taxonomy followed by the IUCN (Note: The IUCN follows the taxonomy proposed by the HBW and BirdLife Taxonomic Checklist.) or the 2023 edition of The Clements Checklist of Birds of the World, the disagreement is noted next to the species's common name (for nomenclatural disagreements) or scientific name (for taxonomic disagreements).

== Classification ==
The International Ornithologists' Union (IOU) recognises 64 species of hornbills across two families and sixteen genera. This list does not include hybrid species, extinct prehistoric species, or putative species not yet accepted by the IOU.

- Bucerotidae
  - Bucorvus – ground hornbills, 2 species
  - - - Lophoceros – 8 species
      - Tockus – 10 species
    - - - - Berenicornis – white-crowned hornbill
          - Horizocerus – 4 species
        - - Ceratogymna – 2 species
          - Bycanistes – 6 species
      - - - Rhinoplax – helmeted hornbill
          - Buceros – 3 species
        - - - Anorrhinus – 3 species
            - - Ocyceros – 3 species
              - Anthracoceros – 5 species
          - - Aceros – rufous-necked hornbill
            - - Rhyticeros – 6 species
              - - Rhabdotorrhinus – 4 species
                - Penelopides – 5 species

Cladogram depicting relationships among the hornbills, based on a 2013 study of molecular phylogenetic data.

== Hornbills ==
=== Bucorvidae ===
Genus Bucorvus – Lesson, 1830 – 2 species
Common name	Scientific name and subspecies	Range	IUCN status and estimated population
Abyssinian ground hornbill	B. abyssinicus (Boddaert, 1783)	Africa	VU Unknown
Southern ground hornbill	B. leadbeateri (Vigors, 1825)	Southern and East Africa	VU Unknown

=== Bucerotidae ===
Genus Tockus – Lesson, R. P., 1830 – 10 species
Common name	Scientific name and subspecies	Range	IUCN status and estimated population
Tanzanian red-billed hornbill	T. ruahae Kemp and Delport, 2002	Central Tanzania	NE Unknown
Western red-billed hornbill	T. kempi Tréca & Érard, 2000	West Africa	NE Unknown
Damara red-billed hornbill	T. damarensis (Shelley, 1888)	Southern Africa	LC Unknown
Southern red-billed hornbill	T. rufirostris (Sundevall, 1850)	Southern Africa	NE Unknown
Northern red-billed hornbill	T. erythrorhynchus (Temminck, 1823)	Africa	LC Unknown
Monteiro's hornbill	T. monteiri Hartlaub, 1865	Angola and Namibia	LC Unknown
Von der Decken's hornbill	T. deckeni (Cabanis, 1868)	East Africa	LC Unknown
Jackson's hornbill	T. jacksoni (Ogilvie-Grant, 1891)	East Africa	LC Unknown
Southern yellow-billed hornbill	T. leucomelas (Lichtenstein, M. H. C., 1842) Two subspecies: T. l. elegans; T. l. leucomelas	Southern Africa	LC Unknown
Eastern yellow-billed hornbill	T. flavirostris (Rüppell, 1835)	East Africa	LC Unknown

Genus Lophoceros – Hemprich and Ehrenberg, 1833 – 8 species
Common name	Scientific name and subspecies	Range	IUCN status and estimated population
Bradfield's hornbill	L. bradfieldi (Roberts, 1930)	Southern Africa	LC Unknown
Crowned hornbill	L. alboterminatus Büttikofer, 1889	Africa	LC Unknown
West African pied hornbill	L. semifasciatus (Hartlaub, 1855)	West Africa	LC Unknown
Congo pied hornbill	L. fasciatus (Shaw, 1812)	Central Africa	LC Unknown
Hemprich's hornbill	L. hemprichii (Ehrenberg, 1833)	East Africa	LC Unknown
African grey hornbill	L. nasutus (Linnaeus, 1766) Two subspecies: L. n. nasutus; L. n. epirhinus	Africa	LC Unknown
Red-billed dwarf hornbill	L. camurus (Cassin, 1857)	East Africa	LC Unknown
Pale-billed hornbill	L. pallidirostris (Hartlaub and Finsch, 1870) Two subspecies: L. p. pallidirostris; L. p. neumanni	Southern Africa	LC Unknown

Genus Bycanistes – Cabanis and Heine, 1860 – 6 species
Common name	Scientific name and subspecies	Range	IUCN status and estimated population
Piping hornbill	B. fistulator (Cassin, 1850) Three subspecies: B. f. fistulator; B. f. sharpii; B. f. duboisi	West and Central Africa	LC Unknown
Trumpeter hornbill	B. bucinator (Temminck, 1824)	Southern and East Africa	LC Unknown
Brown-cheeked hornbill	B. cylindricus (Temminck, 1831)	West Africa	VU Unknown
White-thighed hornbill	B. albotibialis (Cassin and Reichenow, 1877)	Central Africa	LC Unknown
Black-and-white-casqued hornbill	B. subcylindricus (Sclater, P. L., 1871) Two subspecies: B. s. subcylindricus; B. s. subquadratus	Central and West Africa	LC Unknown
Silvery-cheeked hornbill	B. brevis Friedmann, 1929	East Africa	LC Unknown

Genus Ceratogymna – Bonaparte, 1854 – 2 species
Common name	Scientific name and subspecies	Range	IUCN status and estimated population
Black-casqued hornbill	C. atrata (Temminck, 1835)	West and Central Africa	NT Unknown
Yellow-casqued hornbill	C. elata (Temminck, 1831)	West and Central Africa	VU Unknown

Genus Horizocerus – Oberholser, 1899 – 4 species
Common name	Scientific name and subspecies	Range	IUCN status and estimated population
Western dwarf hornbill	H. hartlaubi (Gould, 1861)	Central and West Africa	LC Unknown
White-crested hornbill	H. albocristatus (Cassin, 1848) Three subspecies: H. a. albocristatus; H. a. macrourus	Central and West Africa	LC Unknown
Eastern dwarf hornbill	H. granti (Hartert, 1895)	Democratic Republic of the Congo and east central Republic of the Congo to west Uganda	LC Unknown
Eastern long-tailed hornbill	H. cassini (Finsch, 1895)	Nigeria to north Angola and west Uganda	LC Unknown

Genus Berenicornis – Bonaparte, 1850 – 1 species
Common name	Scientific name and subspecies	Range	IUCN status and estimated population
White-crowned hornbill	B. comatus (Raffles, 1822)	Southeast Asia	EN Unknown

Genus Buceros – Linnaeus, 1758 – 3 species
Common name	Scientific name and subspecies	Range	IUCN status and estimated population
Rhinoceros hornbill	B. rhinoceros Linnaeus, 1758 Three subspecies: B. r. borneoensis; B. r. rhinoceros; B. r. silvestris	Southeast Asia	VU Unknown
Great hornbill	B. bicornis Linnaeus, 1758	South and Southeast Asia	VU 13,000–27,000
Rufous hornbill	B. hydrocorax Linnaeus, 1766 Three subspecies: B. h. hydrocorax; B. h. semigaleatus; B. h. mindanensis (Note: The IUCN lists Buceros mindanensis as a distinct species.)	Philippines	VU Unknown

Genus Rhinoplax – Gloger, 1841 – 1 species
Common name	Scientific name and subspecies	Range	IUCN status and estimated population
Helmeted hornbill	R. vigil (Pennant, 1781)	Southeast Asia	CR Unknown

Genus Anthracoceros – Reichenbach, 1849 – 5 species
Common name	Scientific name and subspecies	Range	IUCN status and estimated population
Palawan hornbill	A. marchei Oustalet, 1885	Palawan and surrounding islands	VU 20,000–49,999
Oriental pied hornbill	A. albirostris (Shaw, 1808) Two subspecies: A. a. albirostris; A. a. convexus	South and Southeast Asia	LC Unknown
Malabar pied hornbill	A. coronatus (Boddaert, 1783)	India and Sri Lanka	NT 7,200–25,000
Sulu hornbill	A. montani (Oustalet, 1880)	Sulu Archipelago	CR 1–49
Black hornbill	A. malayanus (Raffles, 1822)	Southeast Asia	VU Unknown

Genus Ocyceros – Hume, 1873 – 3 species
Common name	Scientific name and subspecies	Range	IUCN status and estimated population
Malabar grey hornbill	O. griseus (Latham, 1790)	Southwestern India	VU Unknown
Sri Lanka grey hornbill	O. gingalensis (Shaw, 1812)	Sri Lanka	LC Unknown
Indian grey hornbill	O. birostris (Scopoli, 1786)	India and Nepal	LC Unknown

Genus Anorrhinus – Reichenbach, 1849 – 3 species
Common name	Scientific name and subspecies	Range	IUCN status and estimated population
Tickell's brown hornbill	A. tickelli (Blyth, 1855)	Myanmar and Thailand	NT 2,500–9,999
Austen's brown hornbill	A. austeni Jerdon, 1872	Southeast Asia	NT Unknown
Bushy-crested hornbill	A. galeritus (Temminck, 1831)	Southeast India	NT Unknown

Genus Aceros – Hodgson, 1844 – 1 species
Common name	Scientific name and subspecies	Range	IUCN status and estimated population
Rufous-necked hornbill	A. nipalensis (Vigors, 1825)	Northwest India and Southeast Asia	VU 7,000–10,000

Genus Rhyticeros – Reichenbach, 1849 – 6 species
Common name	Scientific name and subspecies	Range	IUCN status and estimated population
Blyth's hornbill	R. plicatus (Pennant, 1781)	Maluku Islands and Oceania	LC Unknown
Narcondam hornbill	R. narcondami Hume, 1873	Narcondam Island	VU 300–650
Wreathed hornbill	R. undulatus (Shaw, 1811)	South and Southeast Asia	VU Unknown
Sumba hornbill	R. everetti Rothschild, 1898	Sumba Island	EN 1,000–2,000
Plain-pouched hornbill	R. subruficollis (Blyth, 1843)	Southeast Asia	VU 2,500–5,000
Knobbed hornbill	R. cassidix (Temminck, 1823)	Sulawesi and surrounding islands	VU Unknown

Genus Rhabdotorrhinus – Meyer, A. B. and Wiglesworth, 1898 – 4 species
Common name	Scientific name and subspecies	Range	IUCN status and estimated population
Walden's hornbill	R. waldeni (Sharpe, 1877)	Panay and Negros	EN 1,000–3,000
Writhed hornbill	R. leucocephalus (Vieillot, 1816)	Mindanao	NT Unknown
Sulawesi hornbill	R. exarhatus (Temminck, 1823) Two subspecies: R. e. exarhatus; R. e. sanfordi	Sulawesi	VU Unknown
Wrinkled hornbill	R. corrugatus (Temminck, 1832)	Southeast Asia	EN Unknown

Genus Penelopides – Reichenbach, 1849 – 5 species
Common name	Scientific name and subspecies	Range	IUCN status and estimated population
Luzon hornbill	P. manillae (Boddaert, 1783) Two subspecies: P. m. manillae; P. m. sanfordi	Luzon and surrounding islands	LC Unknown
Mindoro hornbill	P. mindorensis Steere, 1890	Mindoro	EN 250–999
Mindanao hornbill	P. affinis Tweeddale, 1877 Two subspecies: P. a. affinis; P. a. basilanicus	Mindanao and surrounding islands	LC Unknown
Samar hornbill	P. samarensis Steere, 1890	Eastern Visayas	NE Unknown
Visayan hornbill	P. panini (Boddaert, 1783) Two subspecies: P. p. ticaensis; P. p. panini	Western Visayas	EN 1,200
