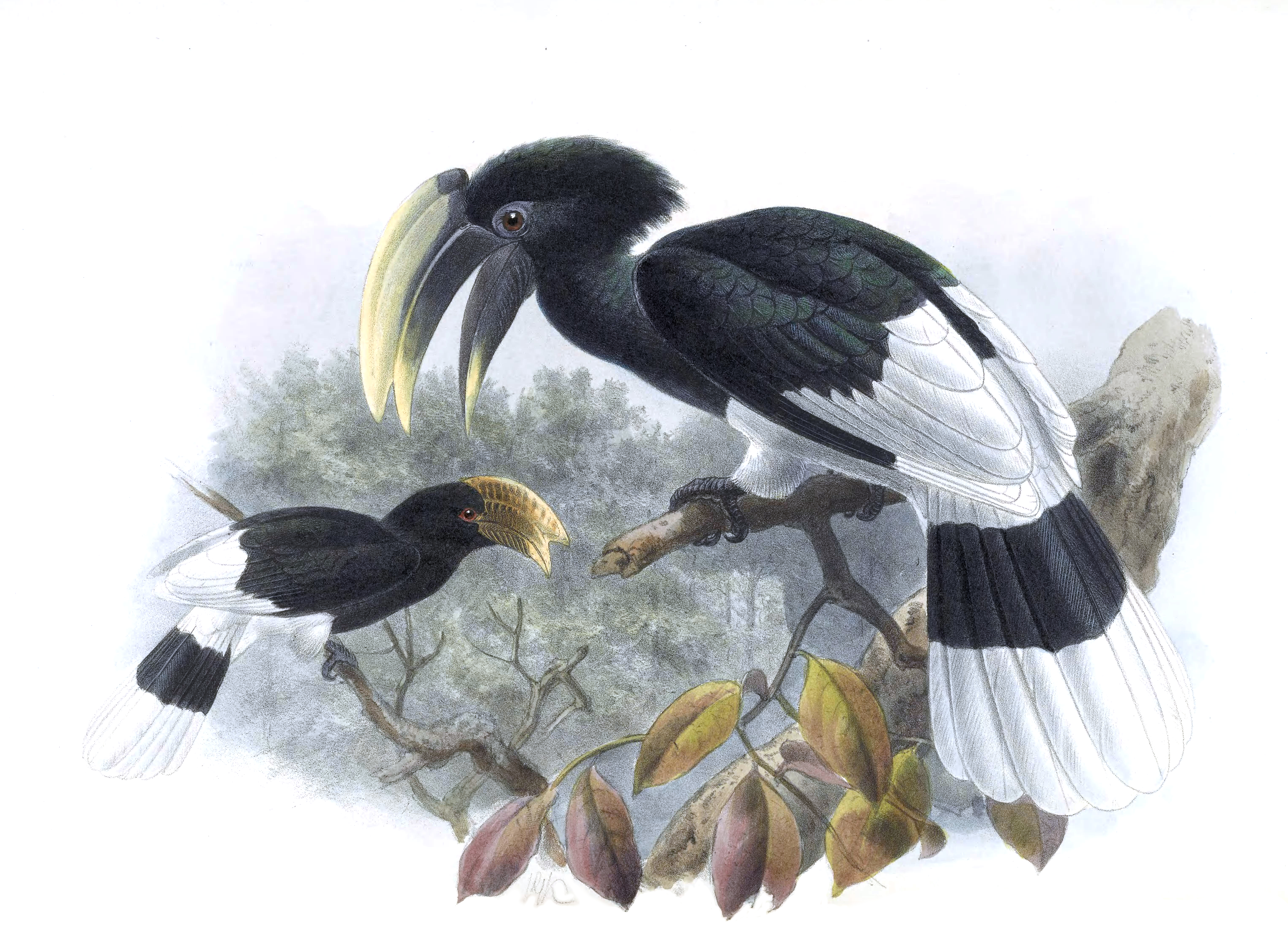

Conservation status
- Least Concern (IUCN 3.1)

Scientific classification
- Kingdom: Animalia
- Phylum: Chordata
- Class: Aves
- Order: Bucerotiformes
- Family: Bucerotidae
- Genus: Bycanistes
- Species: B. albotibialis

Binomial name
- Bycanistes albotibialis (Cabanis & Reichenow, 1877)

Synonyms
- Bycanistes cylindricus albotibialis

= White-thighed hornbill =

Species of bird

The white-thighed hornbill (Bycanistes albotibialis) is a species of hornbill. It is found in Angola, Benin, Cameroon, Central African Republic, Republic of the Congo, Democratic Republic of the Congo, Equatorial Guinea, Gabon, Nigeria, Sudan, and Uganda. It is sometimes considered to be a subspecies of the brown-cheeked hornbill.
