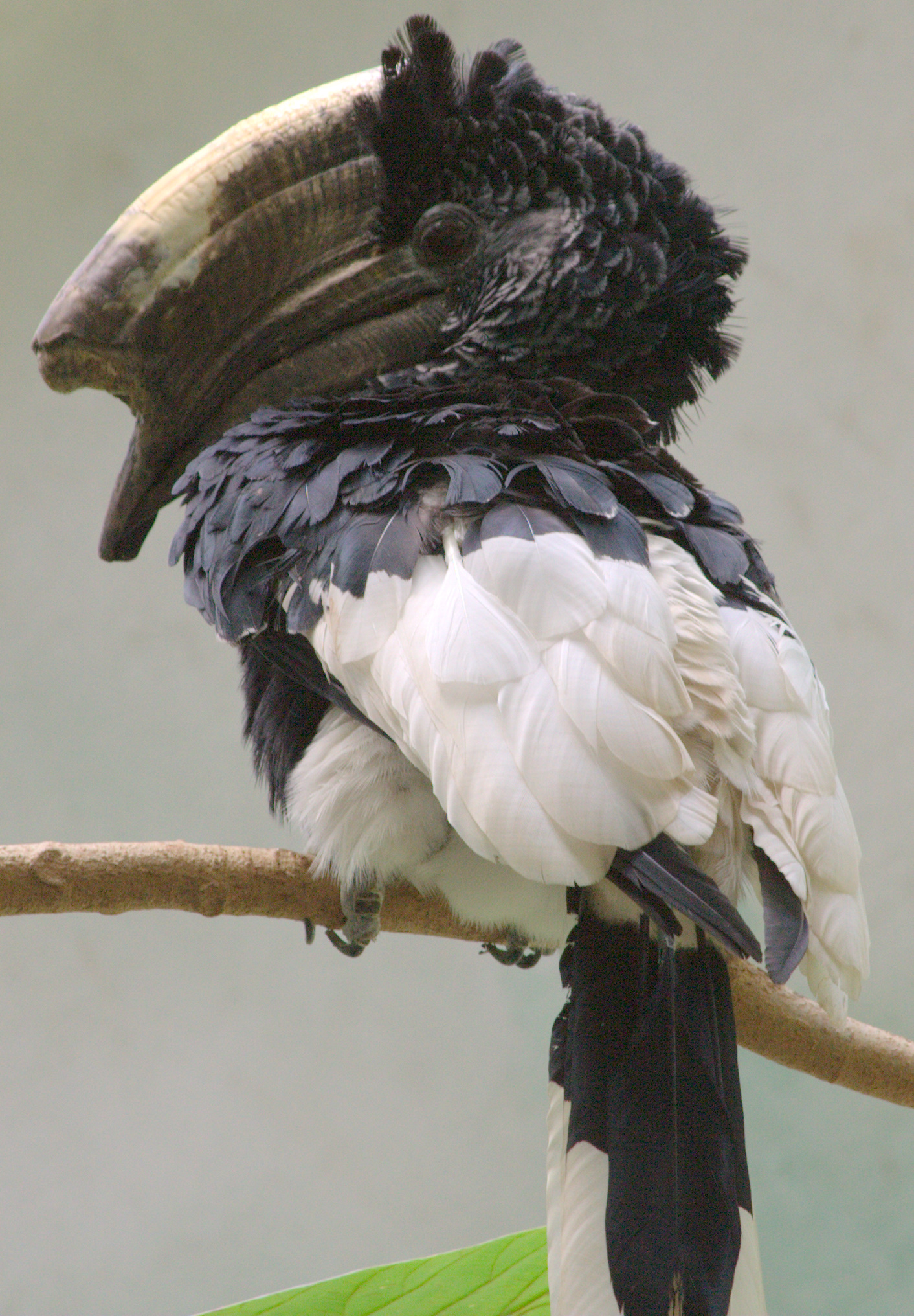
- At Bronx Zoo

Conservation status
- Least Concern (IUCN 3.1)

Scientific classification
- Kingdom: Animalia
- Phylum: Chordata
- Class: Aves
- Order: Bucerotiformes
- Family: Bucerotidae
- Genus: Bycanistes
- Species: B. subcylindricus

Binomial name
- Bycanistes subcylindricus (Sclater, PL, 1871)
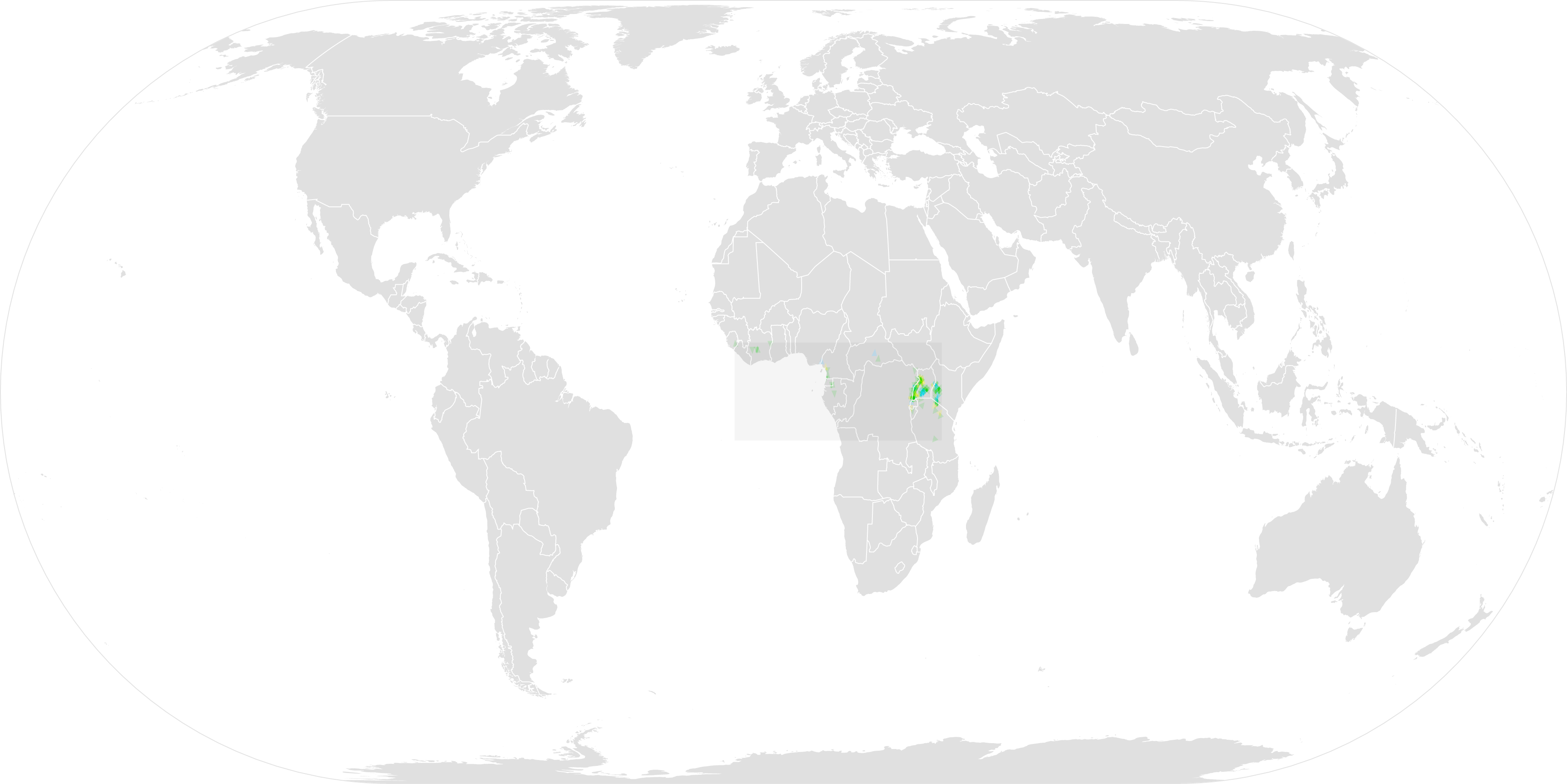
- Global range Year-Round Range Summer Range Winter Range

Audio
- Calls recorded in Kitale, Kenya

= Black-and-white-casqued hornbill =

Species of bird

The black-and-white-casqued hornbill (Bycanistes subcylindricus), also known as the grey-cheeked hornbill, is a large black and white hornbill. It has an oversized blackish bill with a large casque on top. The female is slightly smaller than the male and has a significantly smaller casque. It is a monogamous species, and pairs nest in suitable tree cavities. The female usually lays up to two eggs. The diet consists mainly of figs, fruits, insects and small animals found in the trees.

Widespread and still locally common, the black-and-white-casqued hornbill is assessed as least concern on the IUCN Red List of Threatened Species.

== Taxonomy ==
Bycanistes subcylindricus is part of the Bycanistes genus of sub-Saharian hornbills which currently include a total of six known species that all share a black and white plummage and are mostly frugivores. This genus has recently been related to the Bucorvus genus, known as Ground Hornbills. Most of the species in that genus have a casque, which is larger in males than females. The closest relative to the black-and-white-casqued hornbill is Bycanistes cylindricus or brown-cheeked hornbill which inhabits a similar habitat range.

== Description ==
Bycanistes subcylindricus is a moderately large bird of 60 to 70 cm with a wing span of 70 to 96 cm. It is recognizable by its black plummage for the higher body and wings alongside and white plummage on the lower body and wings with black feathers amongst the white feathers of the tail, particularly the top tail feathers and the base of the tail feathers. It has a yellow-brownish bill and flattened casque, which are enlarged in males. Females have a smaller casque and a black bill. The purpose of the casque is unknown for males, although suggested to be for sexual characterization. The black-and-white-casqued hornbill has very mobile eyes which is not a common trait in birds. This means that its eyes themselves can move in their socket, while other birds tend to have to move their heads to see. It is capable of displaying emotions through the feathers at the top of the head, which allows it to communicate its emotional state. While males weight between 1 kg and 1.5 kg, the females weight between 1 kg and 1.25 kg.

== Habitat and distribution ==
The black-and-white-casqued hornbill is found in wooded habitats in central and western Africa, ranging from western Kenya to Côte d'Ivoire with an isolated population in north Angola. The black-and-white-casqued hornbill is found mostly in Ivory-Coast, with smaller populations in its surrounding countries for West-African populations. The Central-African populations are mostly in Uganda and Kenya as well as Cameroon with smaller populations in Gabon, Tanzania and Central Africa. They are tropical birds that live in regions with high amounts of forests and is rarely seen in on flat lands, especially due to its arboreal nature.

== Behaviour ==
=== Diet ===
The diet of the black-and-white-casqued hornbill consist mostly of fruits, which includes relatively small fruits or pieces of larger fruits. While some may consider this bird, like many other hornbills, to be limited to such food, it has been noted that they are very much capable of hunting small animals, including lizards and the eggs of other birds. Most of the frugal diet of the black-and-white-casqued hornbill comes from figs. The black-and-white-casqued hornbill does not consume water directly and seems to instead hydrate itself from the water contained in the fruits that represent most of its diet. It is capable of precise and delicate handling of edibles by using its beak skillfully in conjunction with its esophagus.

== Gallery ==
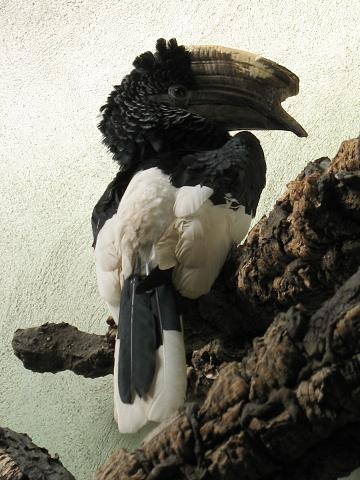

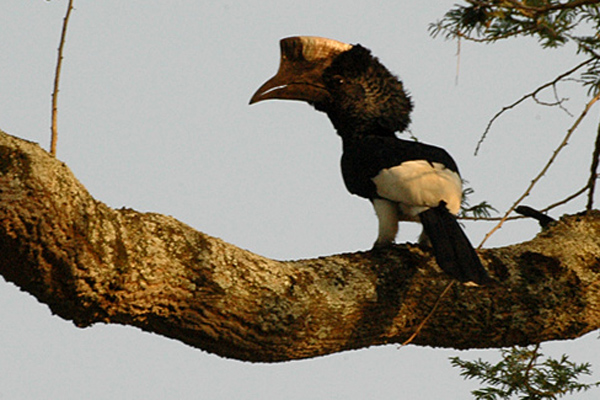

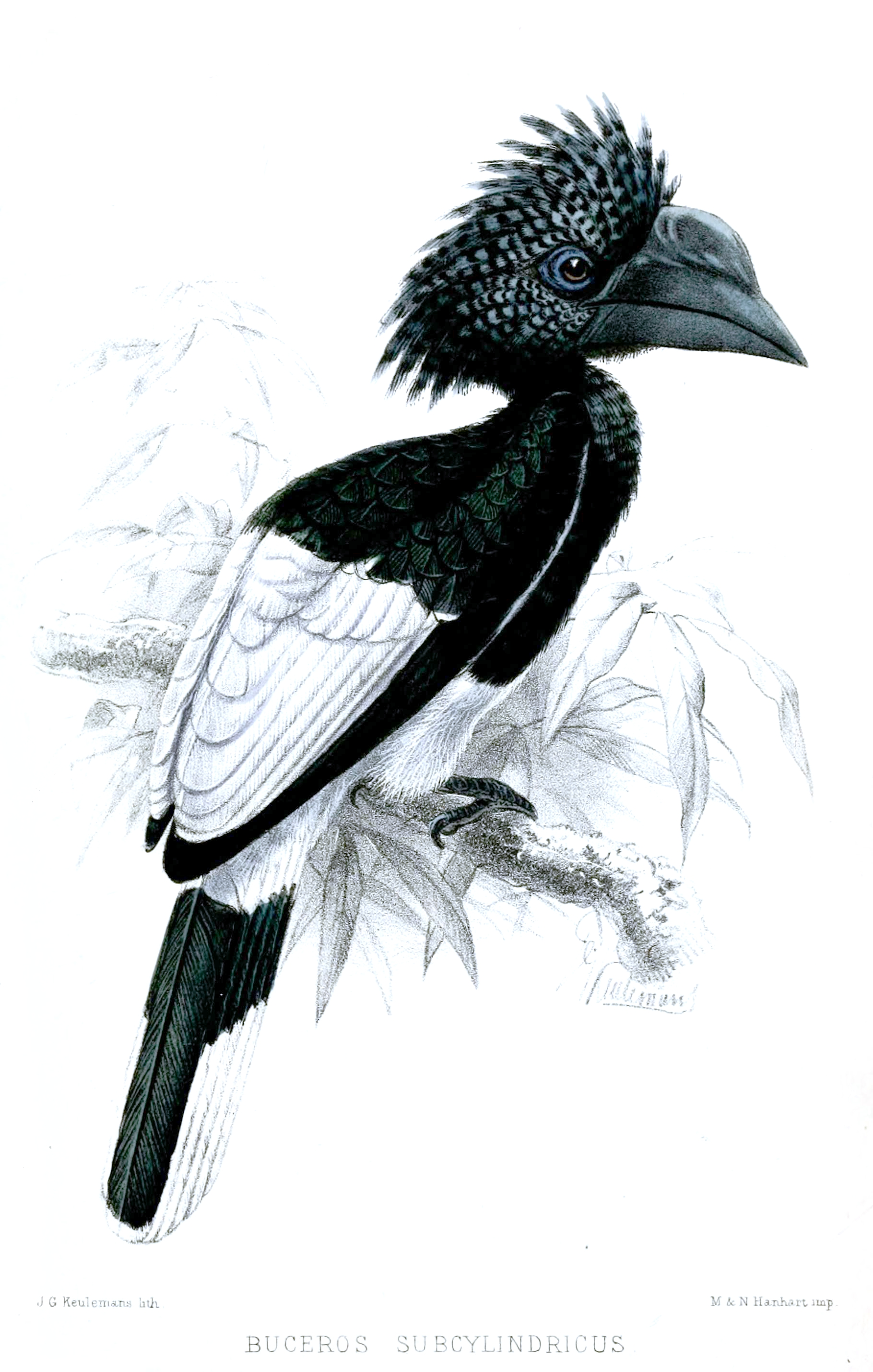

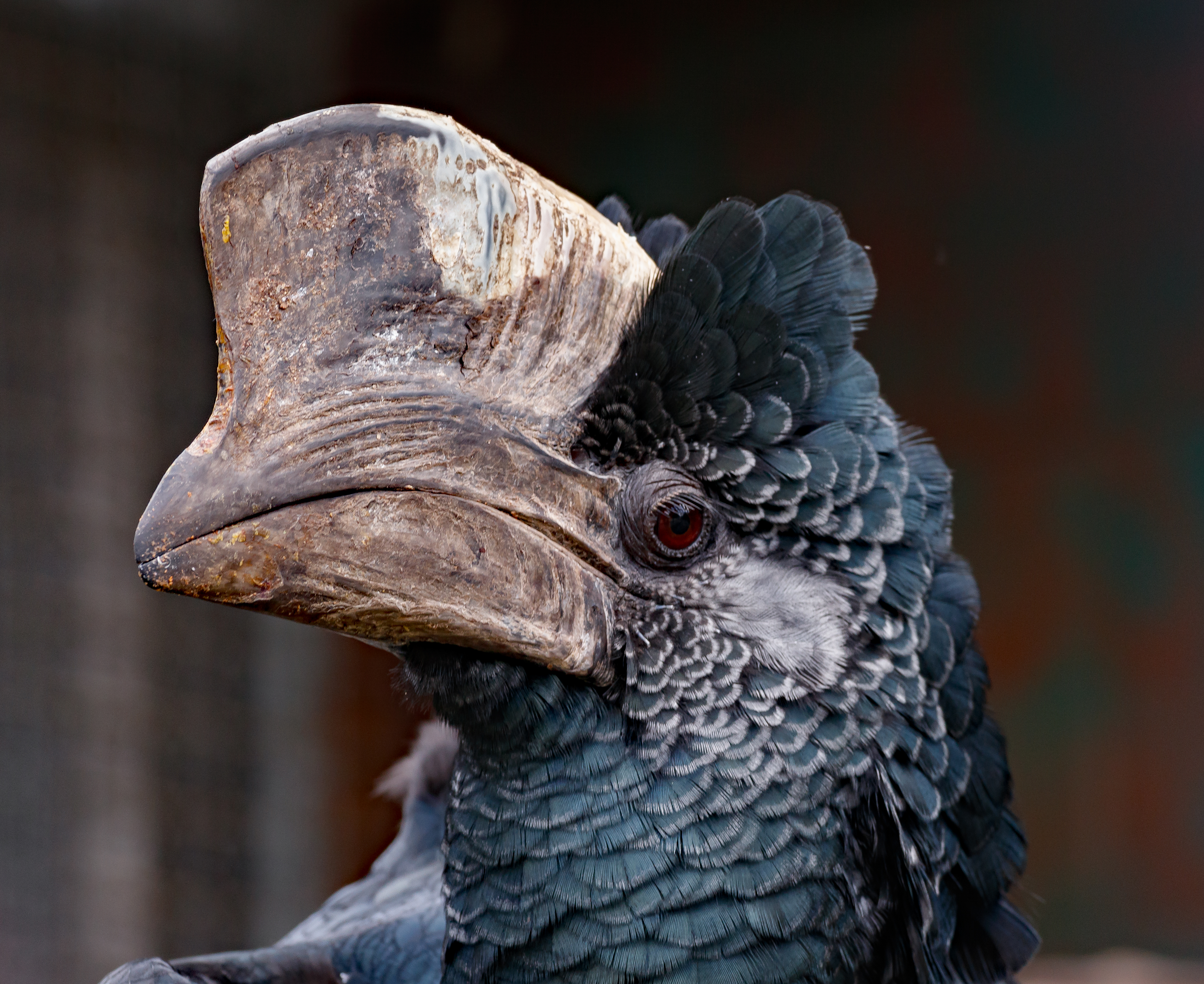
