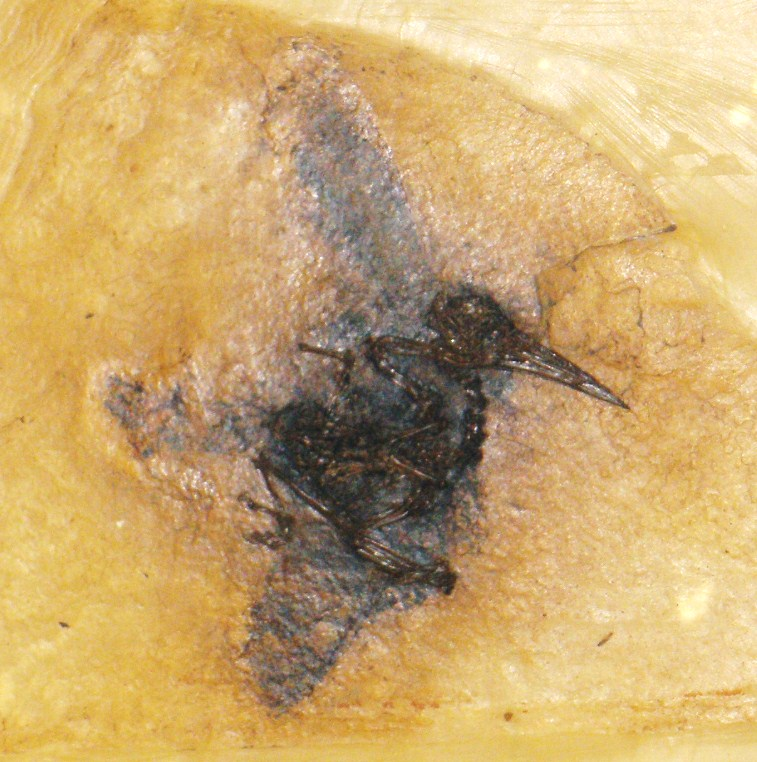
- Fossil of Messelirrisor halcyrostris

Scientific classification
- Kingdom: Animalia
- Phylum: Chordata
- Class: Aves
- Order: Bucerotiformes
- Family: †Messelirrisoridae; Mayr, 1998
- Genus: †Messelirrisor; Mayr, 1998

Type species
- Messelirrisor halcyrostris Mayr, 1998

Other species
- M. grandis Mayr, 2000; M. parvus Mayr, 1998

= Messelirrisor =

Messelirrisor Temporal range: Middle Eocene, 47 Ma

Extinct genus of birds

The extinct Messelirrisor is a genus of Bucerotiformes, the sole representative of the family Messelirrisoridae. They were tiny hoopoe-like birds that were the earliest representatives of the hoopoe/wood-hoopoe lineage, and they were among the predominant small forest birds of Central Europe during the Middle Eocene (some 49-37 mya). Fossilized remains of Messelirrisor have been found in the Messel Pit of Hesse, Germany.

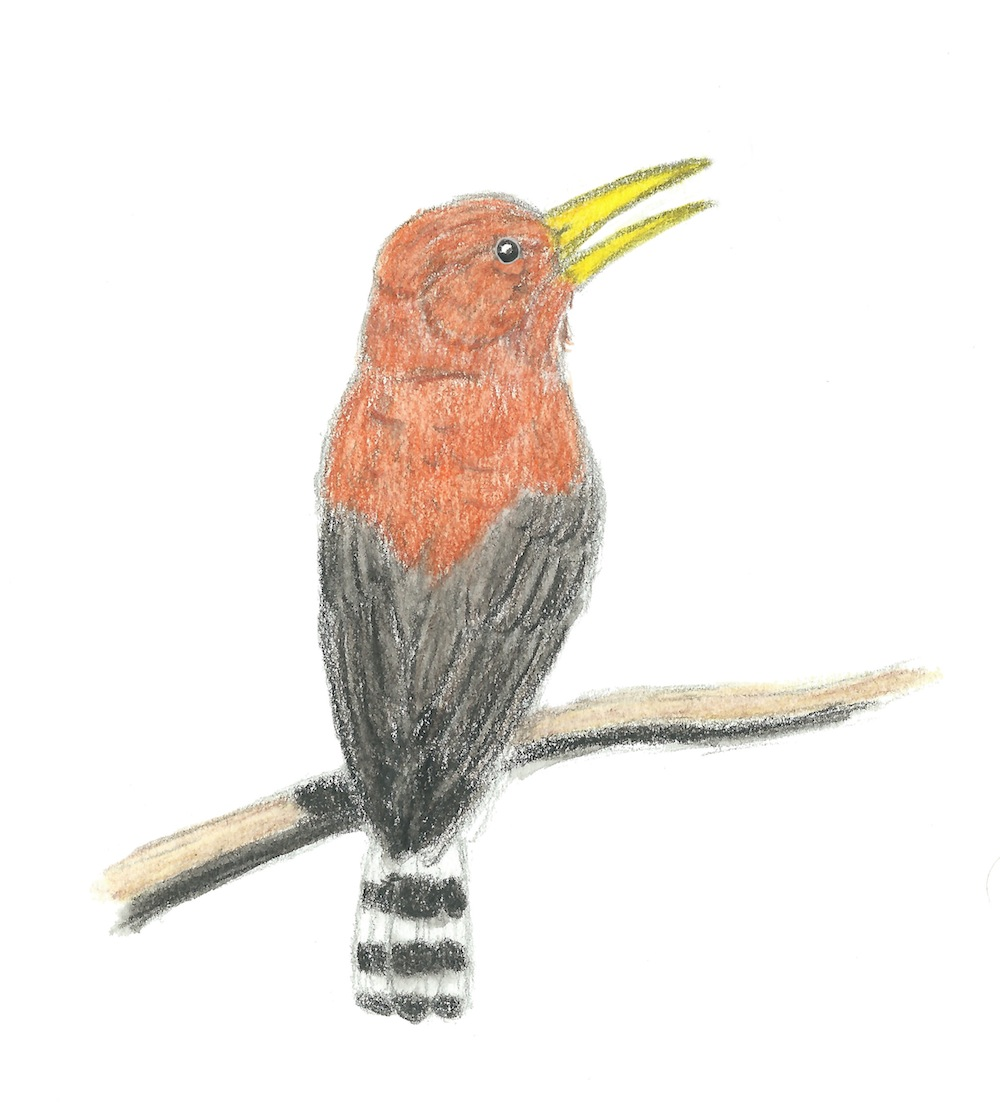
Life restoration

== Sources ==
- Mayr, Gerald (1 October 2000). "Tiny Hoopoe-Like Birds From the Middle Eocene of Messel (Germany)". The Auk. 117 (4): 964–970. doi:10.1642/0004-8038(2000)117[0964:THLBFT]2.0.CO;2. JSTOR 4089635. INIST 1528405.
