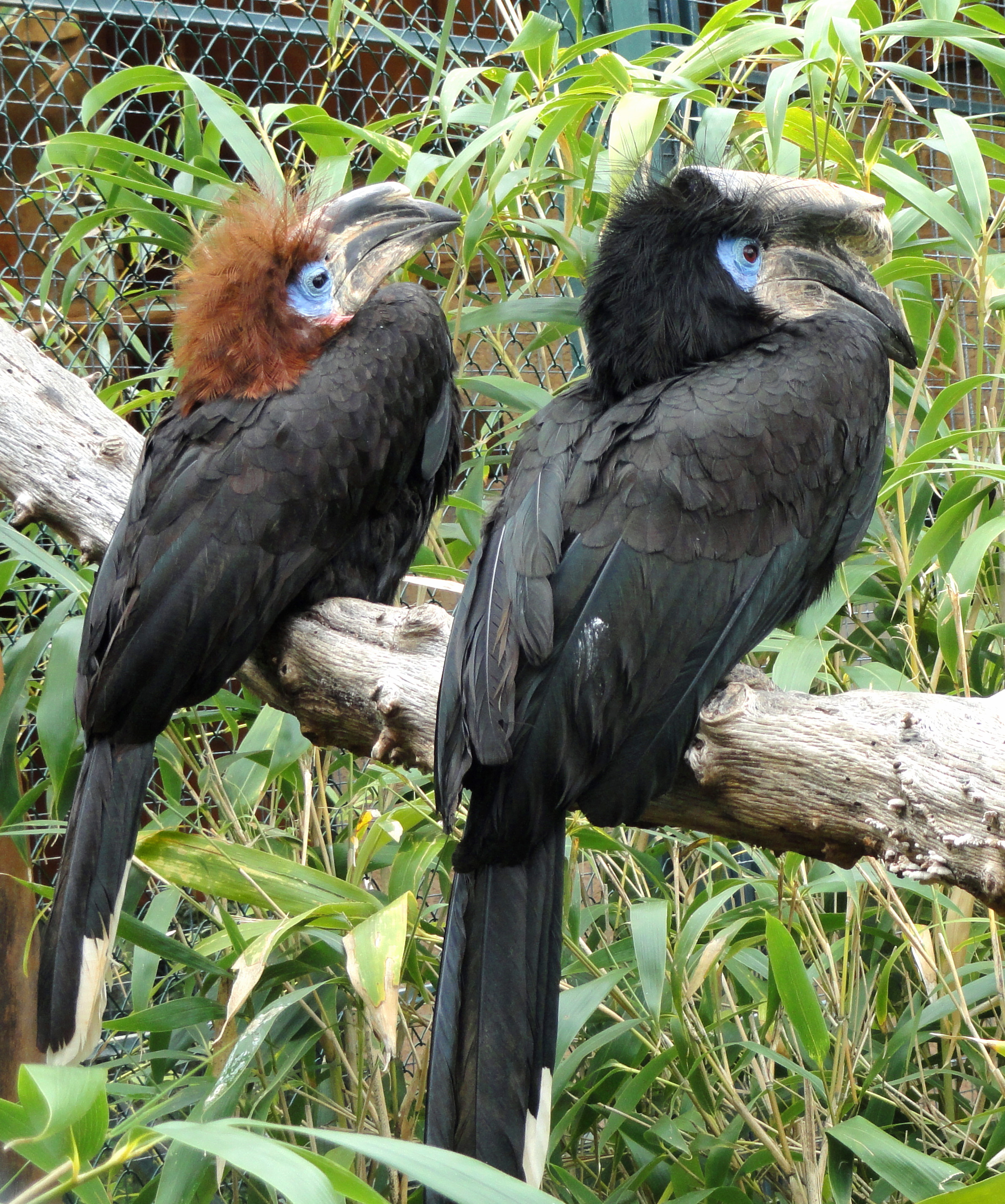
- A pair at the Jardin d'Oiseaux Tropicaux, France (female on left and male on right)

Conservation status
- Near Threatened (IUCN 3.1)

Scientific classification
- Kingdom: Animalia
- Phylum: Chordata
- Class: Aves
- Order: Bucerotiformes
- Family: Bucerotidae
- Genus: Ceratogymna
- Species: C. atrata

Binomial name
- Ceratogymna atrata (Temminck, 1835)

= Black-casqued hornbill =

Species of bird

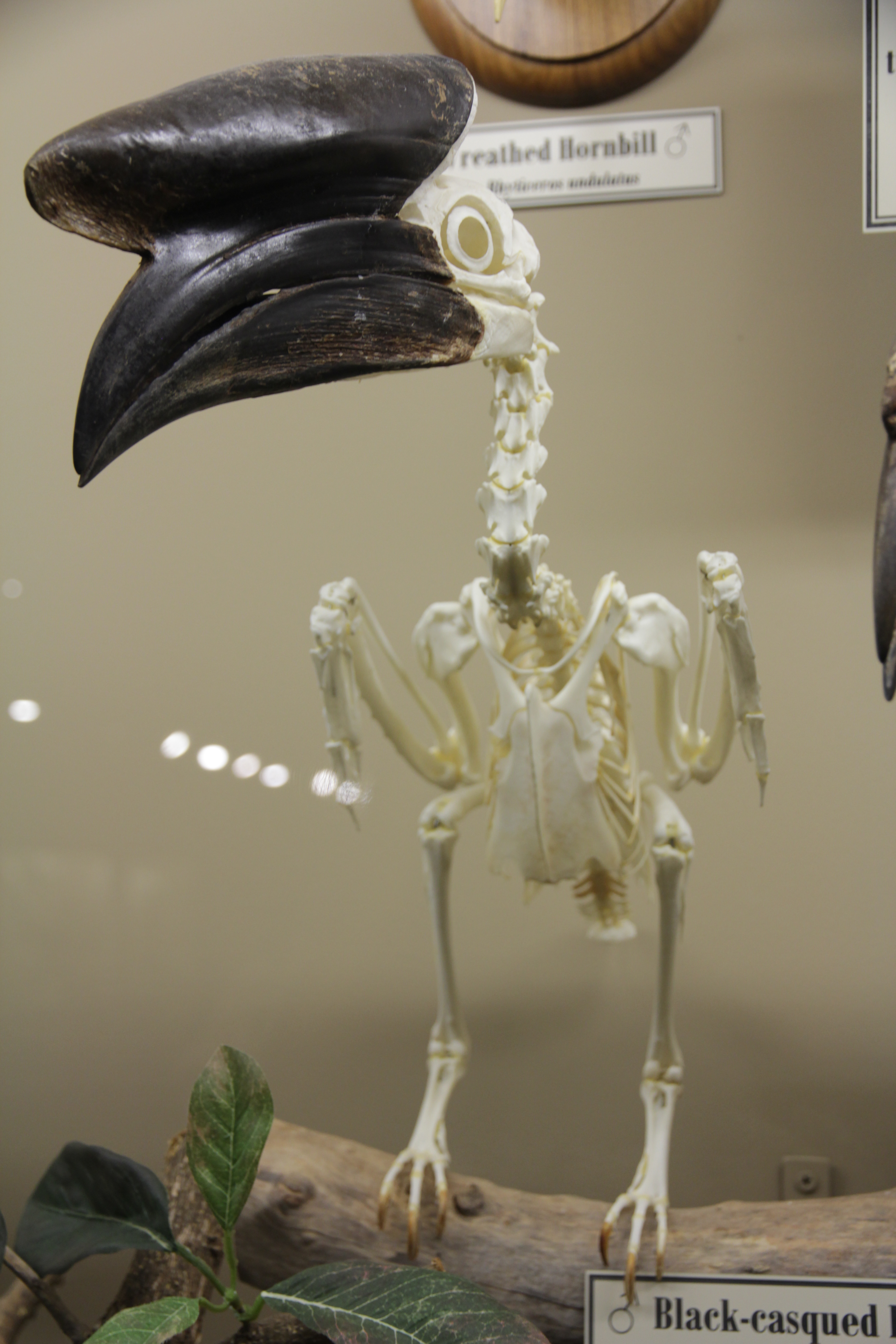
Male black-casqued hornbill skeleton (Museum of Osteology)

The black-casqued hornbill (Ceratogymna atrata), or black-casqued wattled hornbill, is a species of hornbill in the family Bucerotidae. It is found fairly commonly across sub-Saharan Africa, being known from Sierra Leone and Liberia in Western Africa (as well as most of the West African nations along the Gulf of Guinea), south to Angola and east to the Democratic Republic of the Congo and western Uganda. They are currently considered of near threatened, and their population is declining.

== Description ==
The black-casqued hornbill is a large, mostly black bird with bare-skinned blue wattles and skin around their eyes. Adult birds are typically between 60 and 70 cm (24 and 28 in) long, and can be distinguished from the similar yellow-casqued hornbill by the white scales found in their plumage. They are readily identifiable as a member of the hornbill family by the eponymous casque structure that the birds develop on their beaks as they mature.

Like many bird species, black-casqued hornbills exhibit sexual dimorphism. The males are larger, with black heads, and a larger casque. The females have brown hood of feathers.

Both male and female birds have a powerful, "braying" call, which can be heard over 2 kilometers away. The generally louder males also make other calls, including a resonant squawk and a soft chuckling alarm call.

== Behavior ==
Black-casqued hornbills spend most of their time high in the trees of lowland, evergreen forests, although they also occur in nearby plantations and mature secondary growth. They typically live together in pairs or small family groups, although flocks of up to 40 individuals have also been sighted. Flocking black-casqued hornbills may wander for hundreds of kilometers in search of fruiting trees, returning to favored roosting spots at night.

=== Diet ===
Black-casqued hornbills are largely frugivores, with fruit making up 90% of their diets. Figs and oil palm fruits are important staples, but they have been found to feed on the fruits of species belonging to at least 20 separate plant families. Like other members of their genus, black-casqued hornbills are important seed-dispersers for many species of trees.

In addition to fruit, black-casqued hornbills consume a small amount of meat: they have been recorded hawking for insects above the tree canopy, and raiding the nests of other birds, particularly weaver birds.

=== Breeding ===
The black-casqued hornbill appears to be monogamous, breeds once every one to two years, and lays up to two eggs. Like all other species of hornbill, the pair nests in an empty tree cavity; after laying, female hornbills are sealed inside the cavity, leaving only a small opening through which the male delivers food. Scientists have found he availability of fruit in a given year determines the rate at which black-casqued hornbills breed and nest, with at least one instance where a population in south-central Cameroon apparently built no nests during a particularly hard year.
