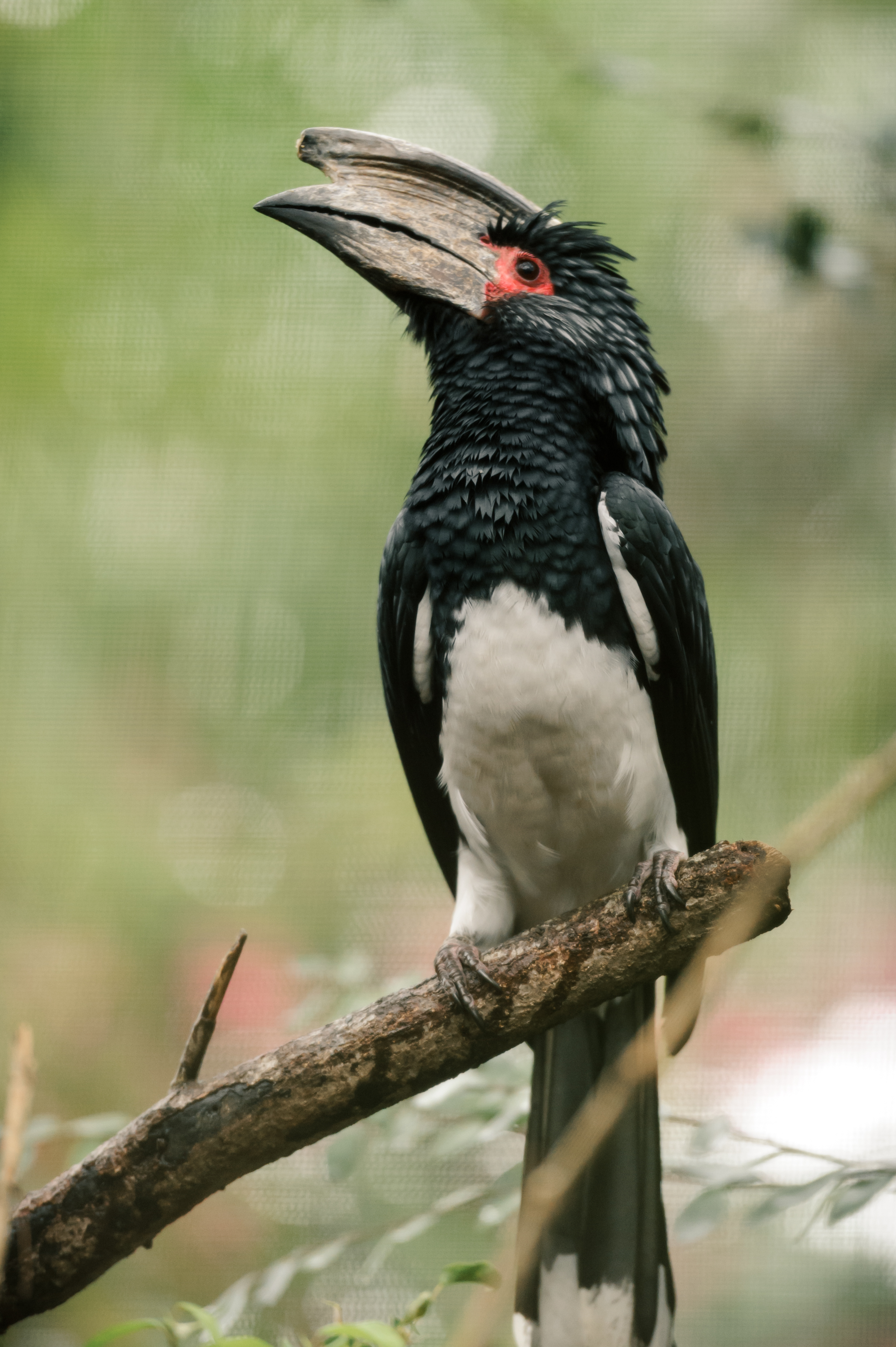
- Male at Lowry Park Zoo in Florida, USA
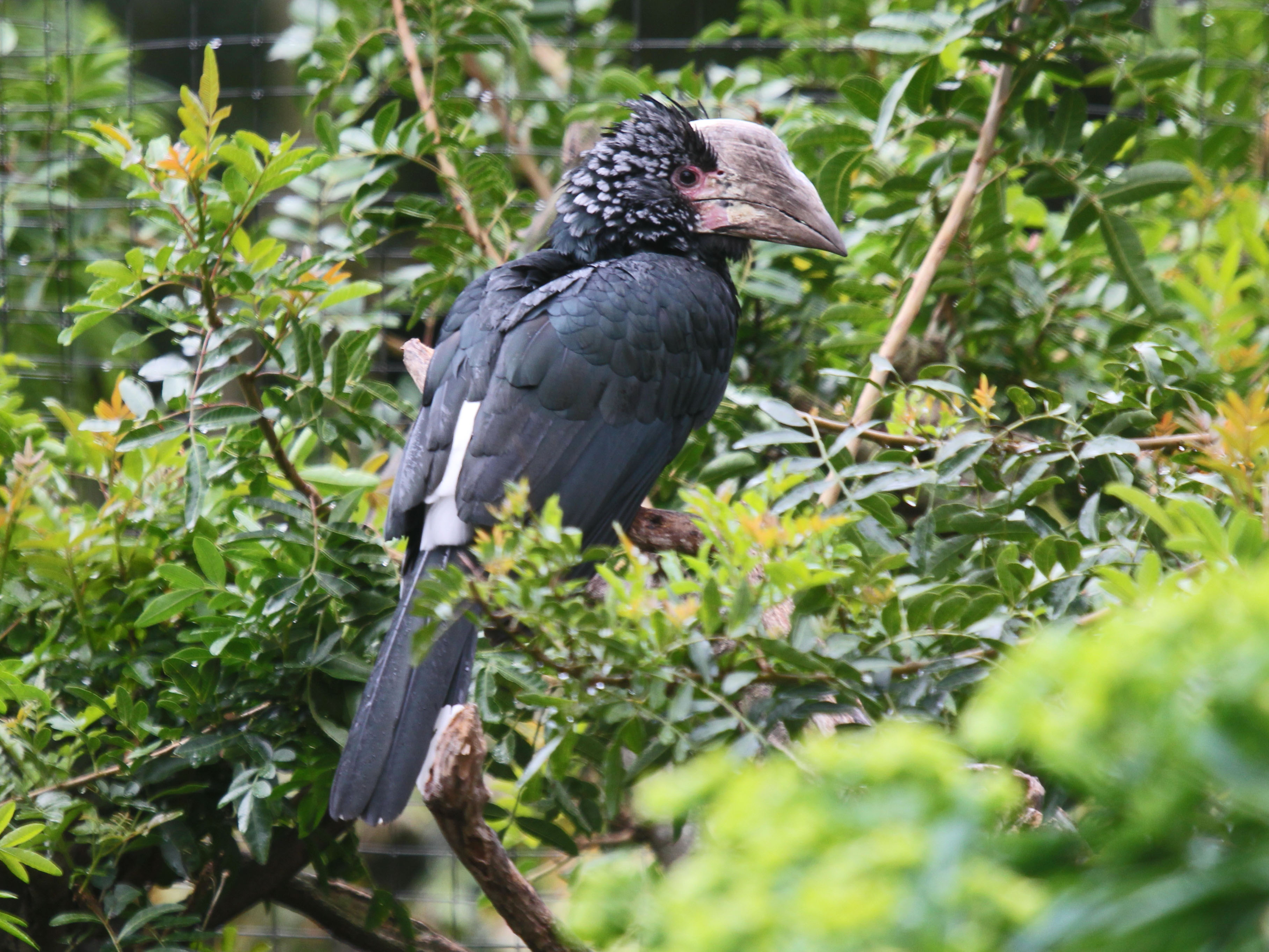
- Female at World of Birds, Cape Town, South Africa

Conservation status
- Least Concern (IUCN 3.1)

Scientific classification
- Kingdom: Animalia
- Phylum: Chordata
- Class: Aves
- Order: Bucerotiformes
- Family: Bucerotidae
- Genus: Bycanistes
- Species: B. bucinator

Binomial name
- Bycanistes bucinator (Temminck, 1824)

Synonyms
- Buceros bucinator Temminck, 1824; Ceratogymna bucinator (Temminck, 1824)

= Trumpeter hornbill =

Species of bird

The trumpeter hornbill (Bycanistes bucinator) is a medium-sized hornbill, with length between 58 and 65 cm (23 and 26 in), characterized by a large grey casque on the bill, smaller in females. The eyes are brown or red, with pink surrounding skin. Body mass is between 0.45 and 1 kg (0.99 and 2.20 lb). It is similar to silvery-cheeked hornbill. Distinguishing features include an all-black back, white belly and white underwing coverts (in flight, wings present white tips), and red facial skin.

The trumpeter hornbill is a gregarious bird, usually living in groups of two to five individuals, although sometimes as many as fifty. This hornbill is a locally common resident of the tropical evergreen forests of Burundi, Mozambique, Botswana, Congo, North Pare Mountains of Tanzania, Kenya, the Caprivi strip of Namibia and eastern South Africa, where it feeds on fruits and large insects. Like other hornbills, the females incubate four to five white eggs while sealed in the nest compartment.

== Aviculture ==
When they are kept and fed in captivity, they are tame, loving birds that can be taught a variety of tricks and enjoy companionship with their owner. They require large, spacious cages to move about in because of their active nature. Care is needed with their high fruit diet because of their susceptibility to excessive iron storage (similar to the excessive iron storage seen in the disease hemochromatosis in humans). They are very intelligent and have a life expectancy of up to 20 years.

Widespread throughout its large range, the trumpeter hornbill is evaluated as least concern on the IUCN Red List of Threatened Species.

== Gallery ==
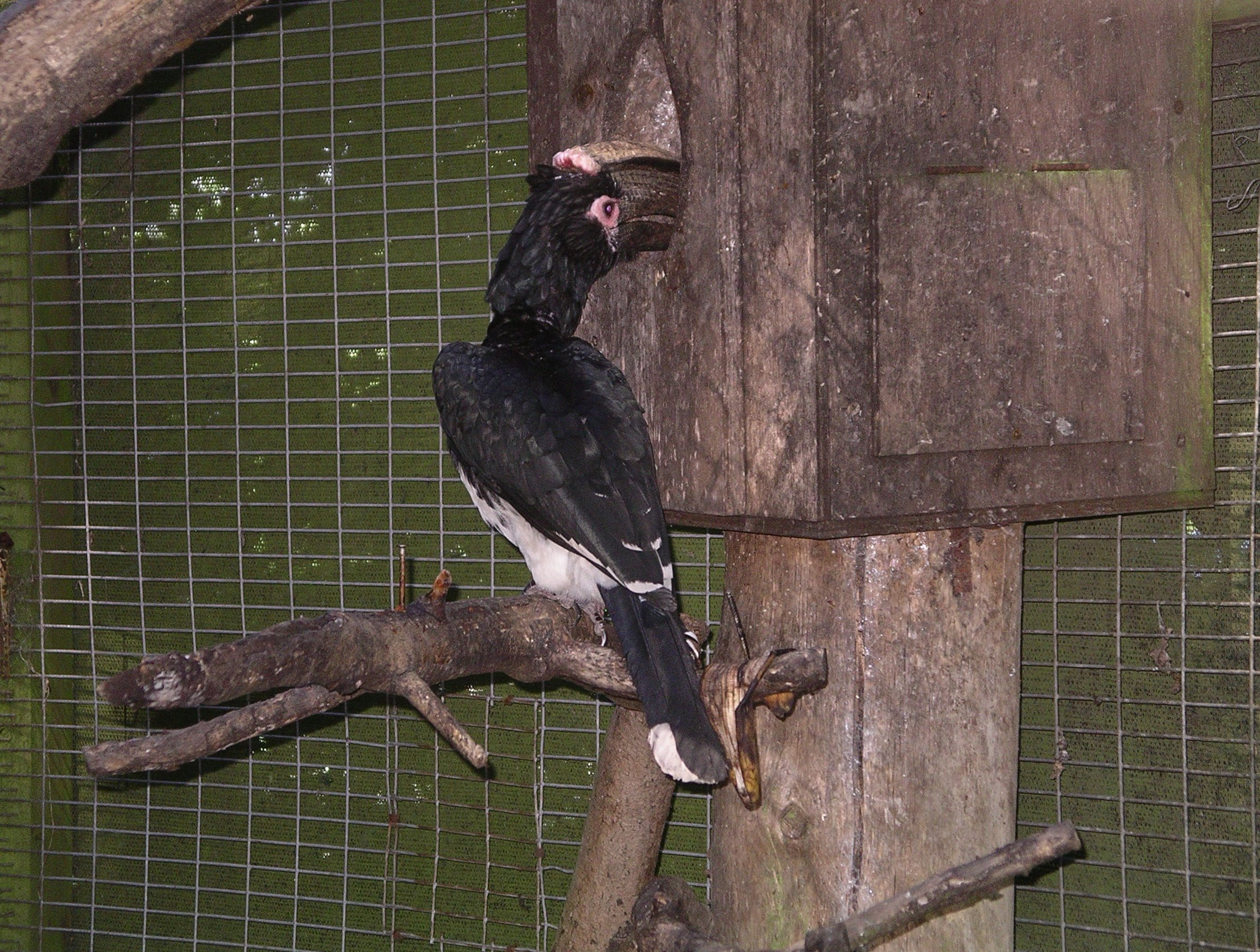
Male feeding female at artificial nest

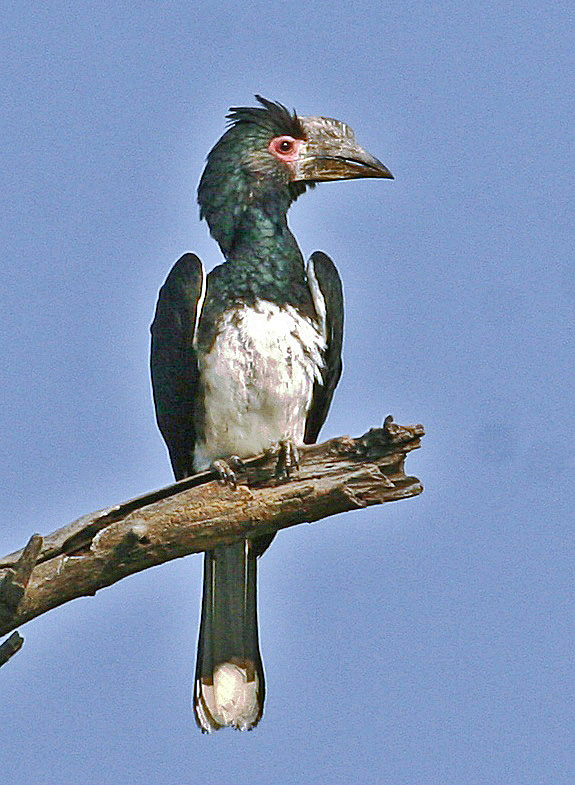
Female in southern Zambia

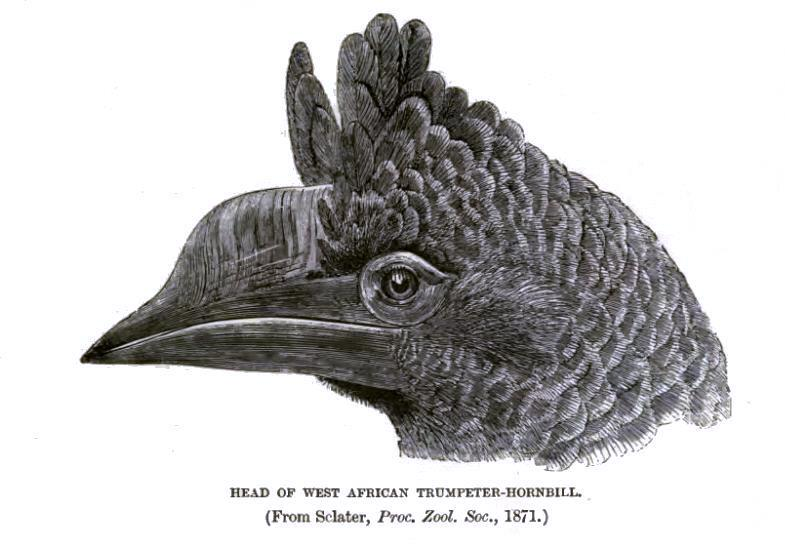
Female head in profile

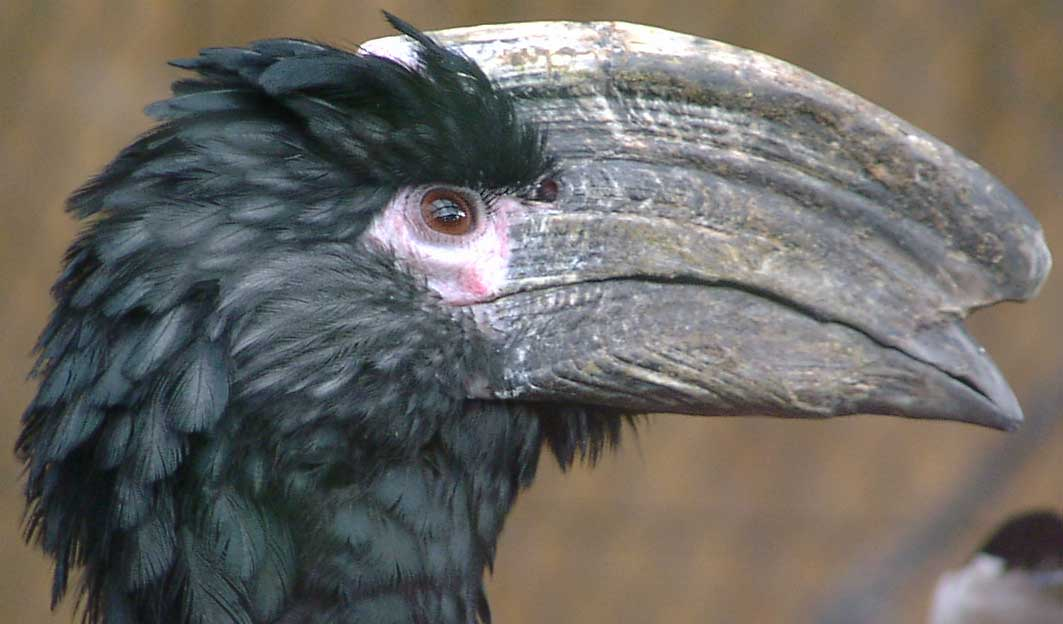
Male head in profile

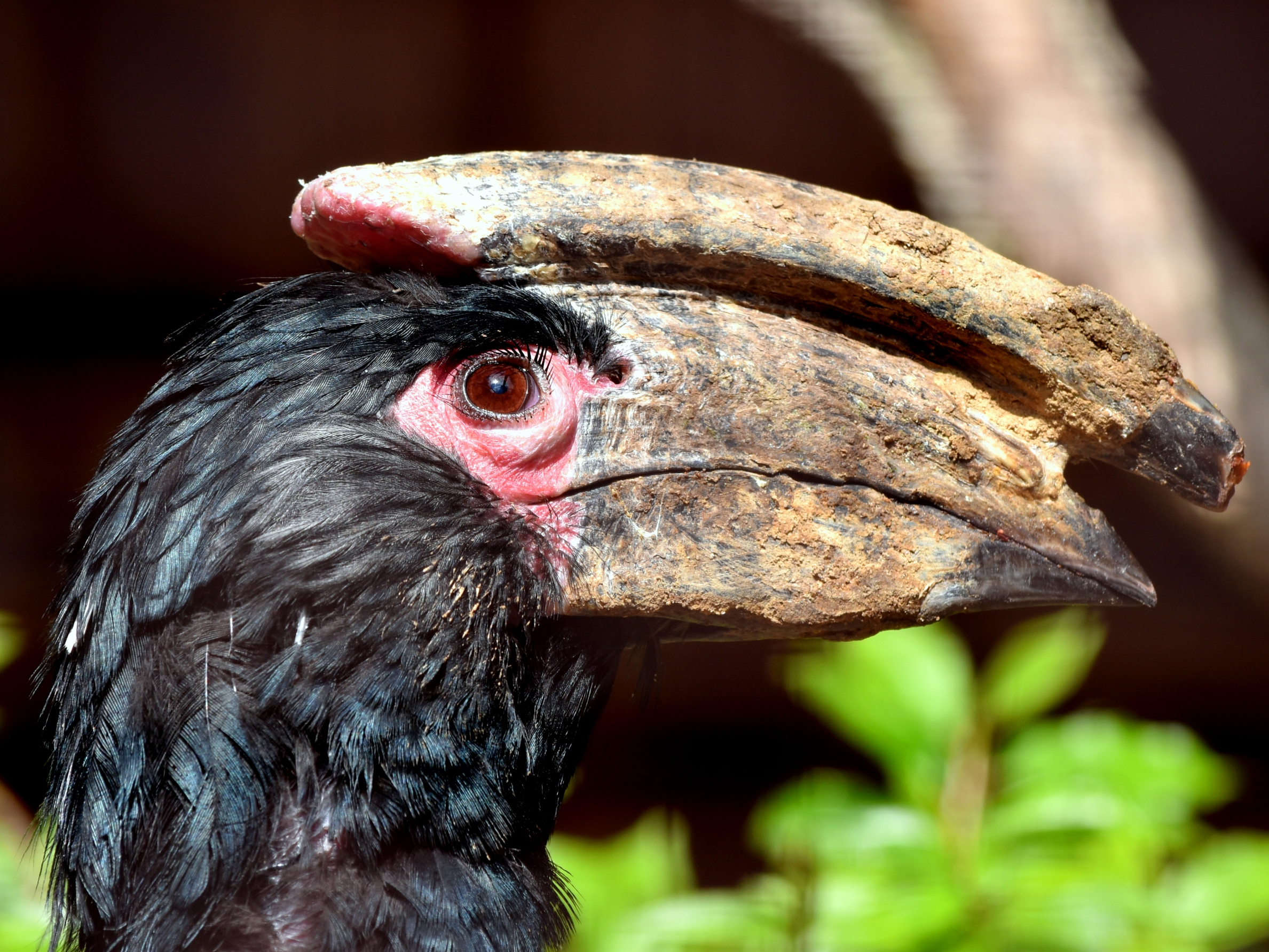
Male in Vogelpark Heiligenkirchen
