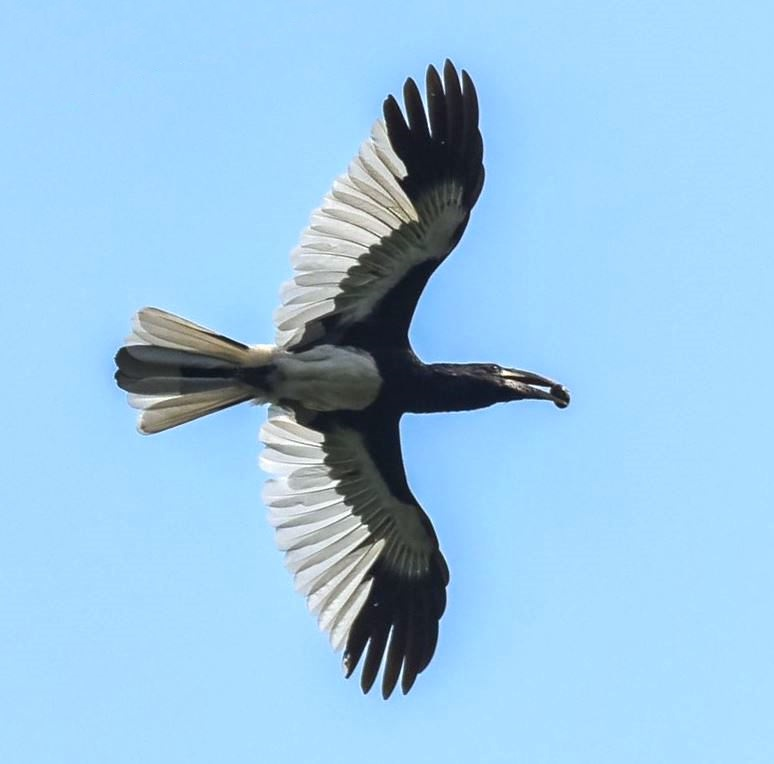
- Individual with palm nut in its bill, at LUFASI Nature Park, Lagos, Nigeria

Conservation status
- Least Concern (IUCN 3.1)

Scientific classification
- Kingdom: Animalia
- Phylum: Chordata
- Class: Aves
- Order: Bucerotiformes
- Family: Bucerotidae
- Genus: Bycanistes
- Species: B. fistulator

Binomial name
- Bycanistes fistulator (Cassin, 1850)

= Piping hornbill =

Species of bird

The piping hornbill (Bycanistes fistulator) is a bird in the hornbill family. This black-and-white species is found in humid forest and second growth in Central and West Africa, ranging from Senegal east to Uganda and south to Angola. At about 50 cm (20 in) in length, it is the smallest member of the genus Bycanistes.

== Gallery ==
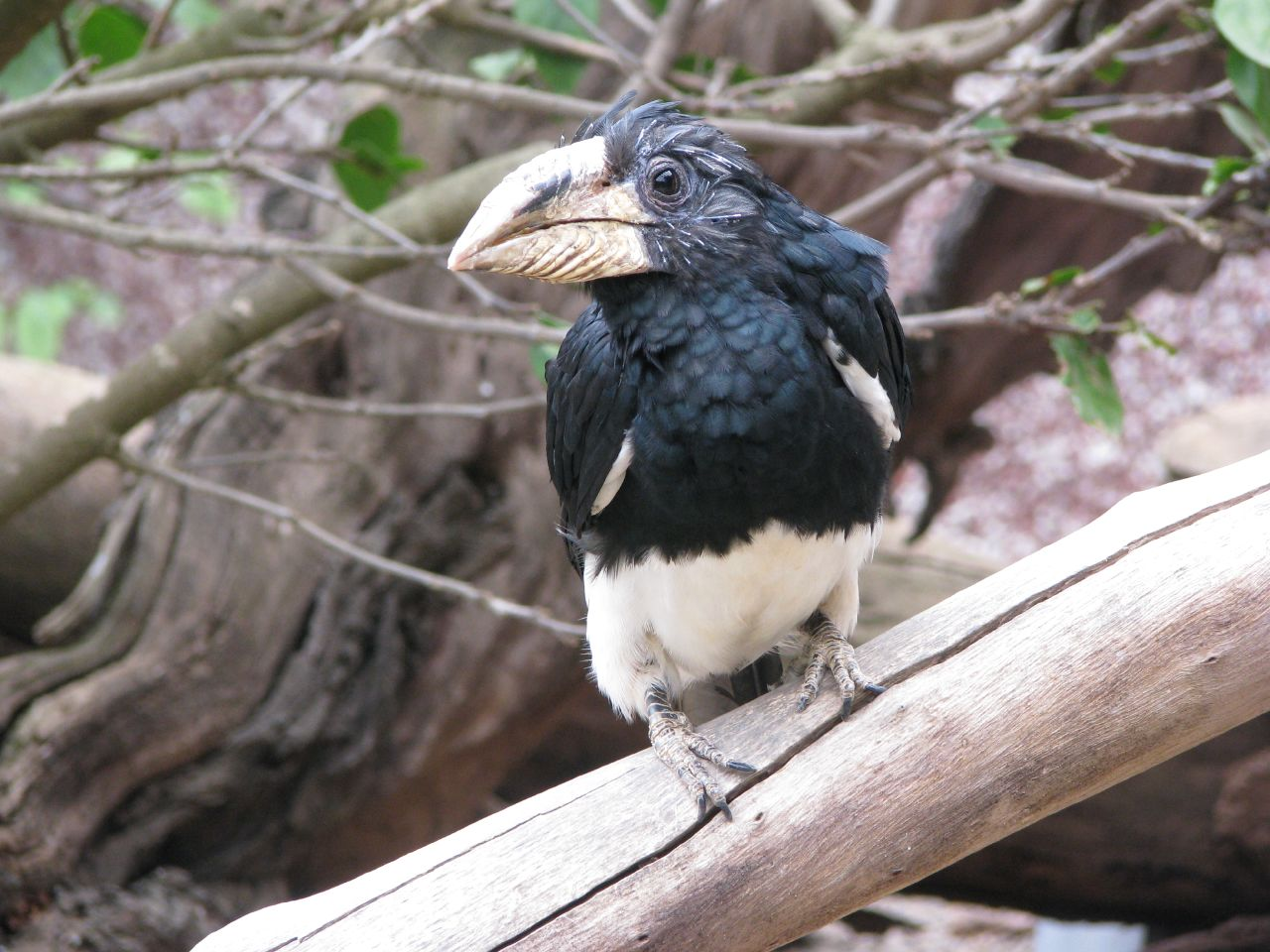
At Guinate Tropical Park, Lanzarote, Canary Islands, Spain

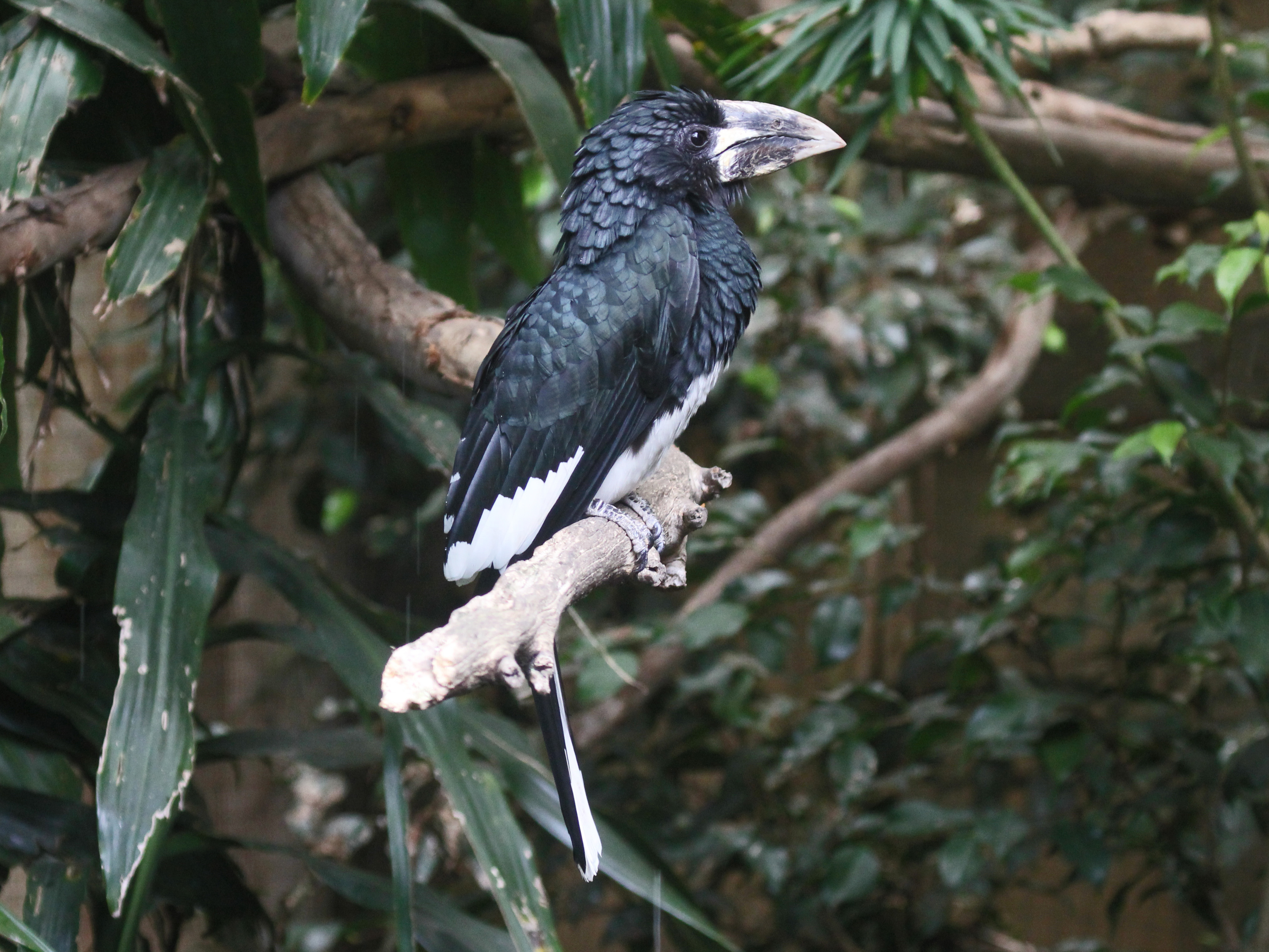
At Birds of Eden aviary, South Africa
