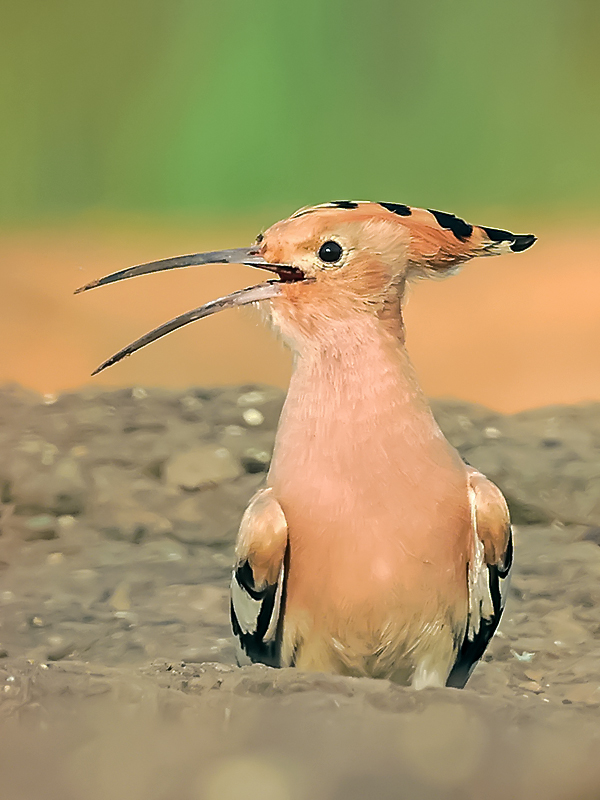
- Eurasian hoopoe (Upupa epops) (Upupidae)
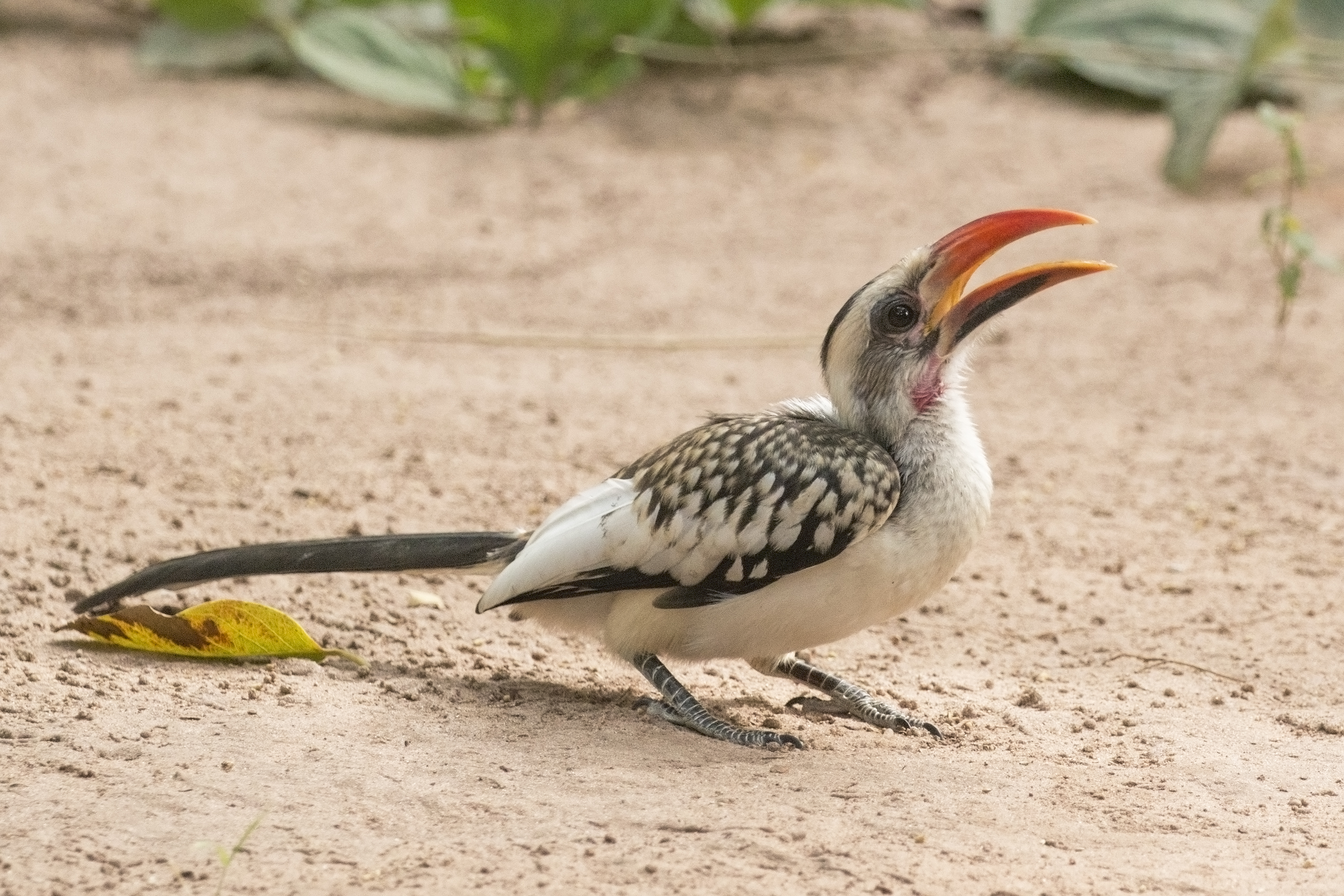
- Western red-billed hornbill (Tockus kempi) (Bucerotidae)

Scientific classification
- Kingdom: Animalia
- Phylum: Chordata
- Class: Aves
- Clade: Picocoraciae
- Order: Bucerotiformes; Fürbringer, 1888

Families
- Phoeniculidae; Upupidae; Bucerotidae

= Bucerotiformes =

Bucerotiformes Temporal range: Eocene to present

Order of birds

Bucerotiformes /bjuːˈsɛrətɪfɔːrmiːz/ is an order of birds that contains the hornbills, ground hornbills, hoopoes and wood hoopoes. These birds were previously classified as members of Coraciiformes. The clade is distributed in Africa, Asia, Europe and Melanesia.

- Bucerotiformes
  - Bucerotidae – hornbills and ground hornbills
  - - Upupidae – hoopoes
    - Phoeniculidae – wood hoopoes

Phylogenetic relationships between the families based on a large study by Richard Prum and colleagues published in 2015.

== Systematics ==
Recent genetic data show that ground hornbills and Bycanistes form a clade outside the rest of the hornbill lineage. They are thought to represent an early African lineage, while the rest of Bucerotiformes evolved in Asia. The hoopoe subspecies Saint Helena hoopoe and the Madagascar subspecies are sometimes elevated to a full species. The two wood hoopoe genera, Phoeniculus and Rhinopomastus, appear to have diverged about 10 million years ago, so some systematists treat them as separate subfamilies or even separate families.

Extinct Messelirrisoridae and Laurillardiidae families were both considered to be stem groups of a previously categorized Upupiformes order prior to it being subcategorized into Bucerotiformes.

=== Taxonomy ===
Order Bucerotiformes

- Family †Messelirrisoridae
  - Genus †Messelirrisor
    - †Messelirrisor halcyrostris
    - †Messelirrisor grandis
    - †Messelirrisor parvus
- Family †Laurillardiidae
  - Genus †Laurillardia
    - †Laurillardia longirostris
    - †Laurillardia munieri
    - †Laurillardia smoleni
- Suborder Upupi
  - Family Phoeniculidae
    - Genus Phoeniculus
      - Green wood hoopoe, Phoeniculus purpureus
      - Violet wood hoopoe, Phoeniculus damarensis
      - Black-billed wood hoopoe, Phoeniculus somaliensis
      - White-headed wood hoopoe, Phoeniculus bollei
      - Forest wood hoopoe, Phoeniculus castaneiceps
    - Genus Rhinopomastus
      - Black scimitarbill, Rhinopomastus aterrimus
      - Common scimitarbill, Rhinopomastus cyanomelas
      - Abyssinian scimitarbill, Rhinopomastus minor
  - Family Upupidae
    - Genus Upupa
      - Eurasian hoopoe, Upupa epops
      - Madagascar hoopoe, Upupa marginata
- Suborder Buceroti
  - Family Bucerotidae
    - Genus Bucorvus
      - Abyssinian ground hornbill, Bucorvus abyssinicus
      - Southern ground hornbill, Bucorvus leadbeateri
    - Genus Bycanistes
      - Trumpeter hornbill, Bycanistes bucinator
      - Piping hornbill, Bycanistes fistulator
      - Silvery-cheeked hornbill, Bycanistes brevis
      - Black-and-white-casqued hornbill, Bycanistes subcylindricus
      - Brown-cheeked hornbill, Bycanistes cylindricus
      - White-thighed hornbill, Bycanistes albotibialis
    - Genus Horizocerus
      - White-crested hornbill, Horizocerus albocristatus
      - Black dwarf hornbill, Horizocerus hartlaubi
    - Genus Tockus
      - Red-billed dwarf hornbill, Tockus camurus
      - Monteiro's hornbill, Tockus monteiri
      - Red-billed hornbill group
        - Northern red-billed hornbill, Tockus erythrorhynchus
        - Damara red-billed hornbill, Tockus damarensis
        - Southern red-billed hornbill, Tockus rufirostris
        - Tanzanian red-billed hornbill, Tockus ruahae
        - Western red-billed hornbill, Tockus kempi
      - Eastern yellow-billed hornbill, Tockus flavirostris
      - Southern yellow-billed hornbill, Tockus leucomelas
      - Jackson's hornbill, Tockus jacksoni
      - Von der Decken's hornbill, Tockus deckeni
      - Crowned hornbill, Tockus alboterminatus
      - Bradfield's hornbill, Tockus bradfieldi
      - African pied hornbill, Tockus fasciatus
      - Hemprich's hornbill, Tockus hemprichii
      - Pale-billed hornbill, Tockus pallidirostris
      - African grey hornbill, Tockus nasutus
    - Genus Ocyceros
      - Malabar grey hornbill, Ocyceros griseus
      - Sri Lanka grey hornbill, Ocyceros gingalensis
      - Indian grey hornbill, Ocyceros biostris
    - Genus Anthracoceros
      - Malabar pied hornbill, Anthracoceros coronatus
      - Oriental pied hornbill, Anthracoceros albirostris
      - Black hornbill, Anthracoceros malayanus
      - Palawan hornbill, Antracoceros marchei
      - Sulu hornbill, Anthracoceros montani
    - Genus Buceros
      - Rhinoceros hornbill, Buceros rhinoceros
      - Great hornbill, Buceros bicornis
      - Rufous hornbill, Buceros hydrocorax
    - Genus Rhinoplax (sometimes included in Buceros)
      - Helmeted hornbill, Rhinoplax vigil
    - Genus Anorrhinus
      - Austen's brown hornbill, Anorrhinus austeni
      - Tickell's brown hornbill, Anorrhinus tickelli
      - Bushy-crested hornbill, Anorrhinus galeritus
    - Genus Penelopides
      - Luzon hornbill, Penelopides manillae
      - Mindoro hornbill, Penelopides mindorensis
      - Visayan hornbill, Penelopides panini
      - Samar hornbill, Penelopides samarensis
      - Mindanao hornbill, Penelopides affinis
    - Genus Berenicornis (sometimes included in Aceros)
      - White-crowned hornbill, Berenicornis comatus
    - Genus Aceros
      - Rufous-necked hornbill, Aceros nipalensis
    - Genus Rhabdotorrhinus
      - Wrinkled hornbill, Rhabdotorrhinus corrugatus
      - Writhed hornbill, Rhabdotorrhinus leucocephalus
      - Rufous-headed hornbill, Rhabdotorrhinus waldeni
      - Sulawesi hornbill, Rhabdotorrhinus exarhatus
    - Genus Rhyticeros (sometimes included in Aceros)
      - Wreathed hornbill, Rhyticeros undulatus
      - Narcondam hornbill, Rhyticeros narcondami
      - Sumba hornbill, Rhyticeros everetti
      - Plain-pouched hornbill, Rhyticeros subruficollis
      - Papuan hornbill, Rhyticeros plicatus
      - Knobbed hornbill, Rhyticeros cassidix
    - Genus Ceratogymna
      - Black-casqued hornbill, Ceratogymna atrata
      - Yellow-casqued hornbill, Ceratogymna elate
