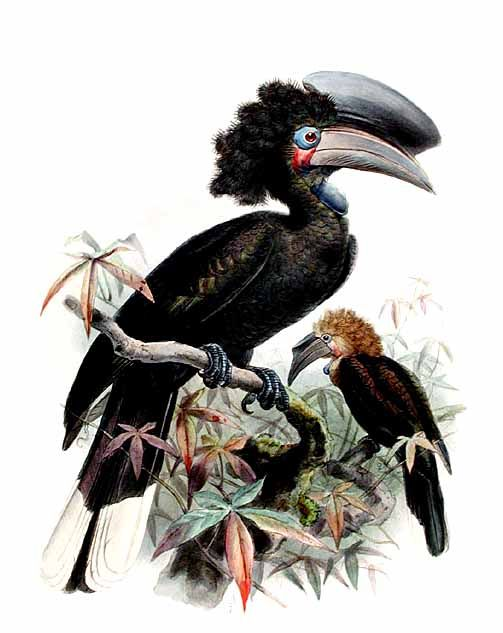
- Black-casqued hornbill (Ceratogymna atrata)

Scientific classification
- Kingdom: Animalia
- Phylum: Chordata
- Class: Aves
- Order: Bucerotiformes
- Family: Bucerotidae
- Genus: Ceratogymna; Bonaparte, 1854

Type species
- Buceros elatus Temminck, 1831

Species
- 2, see text.

= Ceratogymna =

Genus of birds

Ceratogymna is a genus of large, primarily frugivorous hornbills (family Bucerotidae) found in the humid forests of Central and West Africa. They are sexually dimorphic: males are all black, while females have brown heads and a smaller casque. Unlike the members of the genus Bycanistes, the two species in the genus Ceratogymna have extensive, primarily blue, bare facial skin and dewlap, and the only white in their plumage is in the tail (although the yellow-casqued wattled hornbill has slight whitish speckling on the neck).

== Species ==
Genus Ceratogymna – Bonaparte, 1854 – two species
Common name	Scientific name and subspecies	Range	Size and ecology	IUCN status and estimated population
Black-casqued hornbill	Ceratogymna atrata Temminck, 1835	Angola, Cameroon, Central African Republic, Republic of the Congo, Democratic Republic of the Congo, Ivory Coast, Equatorial Guinea, Gabon, Ghana, Guinea, Liberia, Nigeria, Sierra Leone, South Sudan, Togo, and Uganda.	Size: Habitat: Diet:	LC
Yellow-casqued hornbill	Ceratogymna elata (Temminck, 1831)	West Africa	Size: Habitat: Diet:	VU

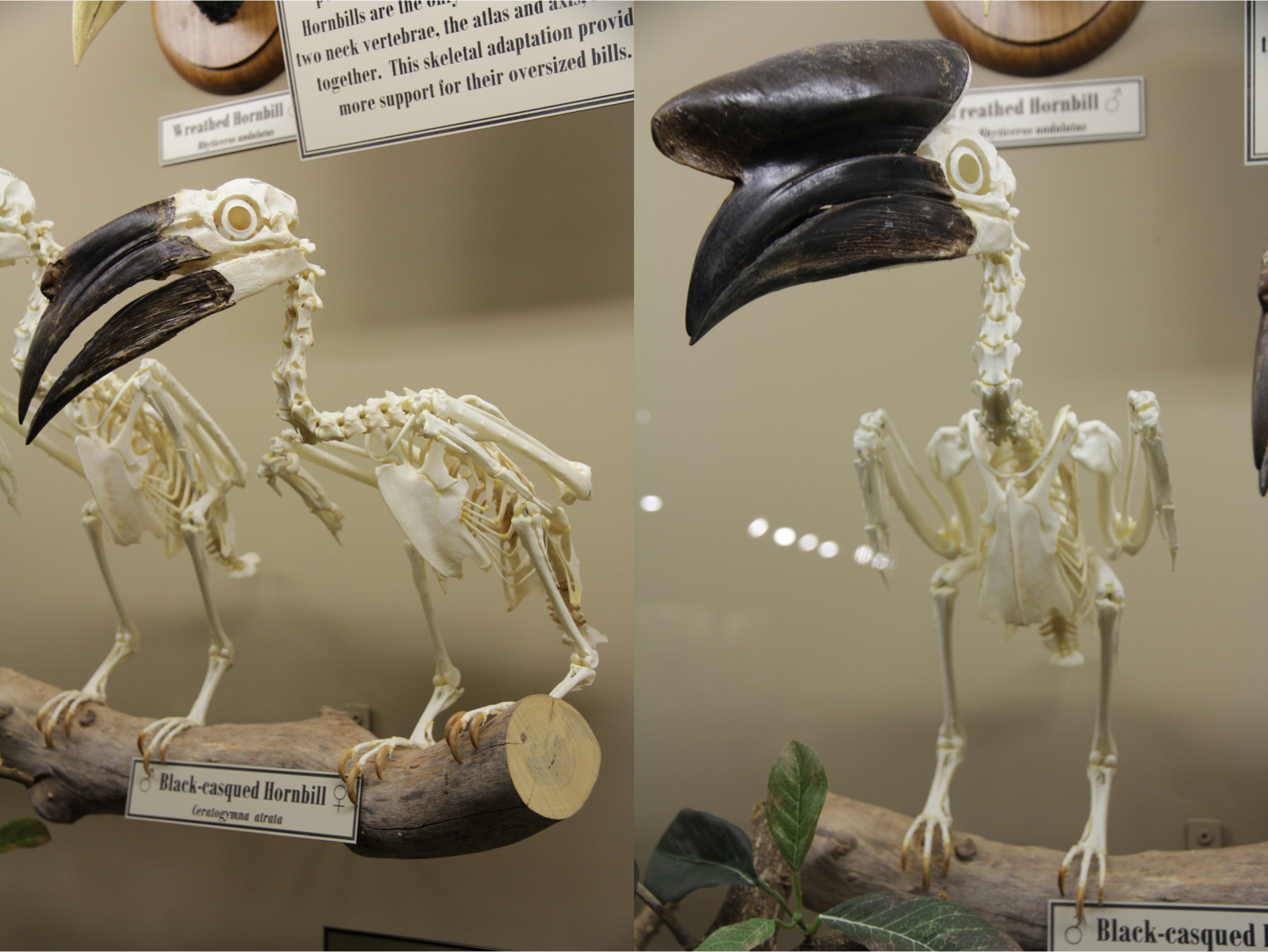
Skeletons of female (left) and male (right) black-casqued hornbills, showing the sexual dimorphism present on their bills. (Museum of Osteology)

The members of the genus Bycanistes have been included in this genus, but today most authorities consider the two separate.
