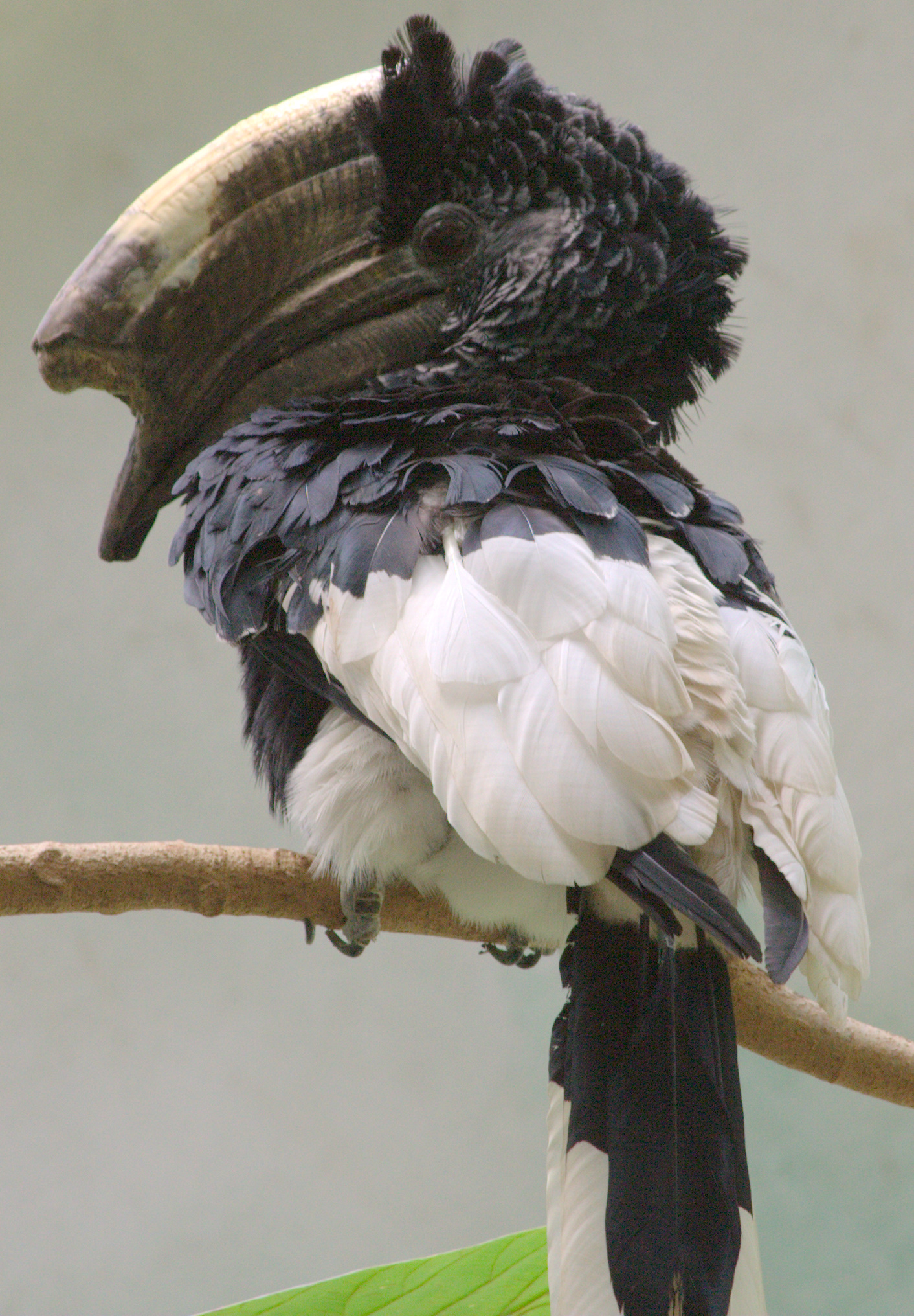
- Black-and-white-casqued hornbill (Bycanistes subcylindricus)

Scientific classification
- Kingdom: Animalia
- Phylum: Chordata
- Class: Aves
- Order: Bucerotiformes
- Family: Bucerotidae
- Genus: Bycanistes; Cabanis & Heine, 1860

Type species
- Buceros bucinator Temminck, 1824

Species
- 5-6, see text.

= Bycanistes =

Genus of birds

Bycanistes is a genus of medium to large, primarily frugivorous hornbills (family Bucerotidae) found in the forests and woodlands of Sub-Saharan Africa. They have often been included in the genus Ceratogymna, but today most authorities consider them separate. All species in this genus have black and white plumage. The plumage of the sexes is similar, but the casque of the male is larger than that of the female.

Recent genetic data shows that Bycanistes is the sister taxon to ground hornbills, this clade having diverged from the rest of the hornbill lineage early on. Bycanistes is thought to represent an early African lineage, while the remaining Bucerotiformes evolved in Asia.

== Species ==
The genus contains the following six species:

Image	Scientific name	Common name	Distribution
	Bycanistes fistulator	Piping hornbill	Senegal east to Uganda and south to Angola
	Bycanistes bucinator	Trumpeter hornbill	Burundi, Mozambique, Botswana, Congo, Kenya, the Caprivi strip of Namibia and eastern South Africa
	Bycanistes cylindricus	Brown-cheeked hornbill	Ivory Coast, Ghana, Guinea, Liberia, Sierra Leone, and Togo
	Bycanistes albotibialis	White-thighed hornbill	Angola, Benin, Cameroon, Central African Republic, Republic of the Congo, Democratic Republic of the Congo, Equatorial Guinea, Gabon, Nigeria, Sudan, and Uganda
	Bycanistes subcylindricus	Black-and-white-casqued hornbill	western Kenya to Côte d'Ivoire with an isolated population in north Angola
	Bycanistes brevis	Silvery-cheeked hornbill	forests of East Africa from Ethiopia to South Africa
