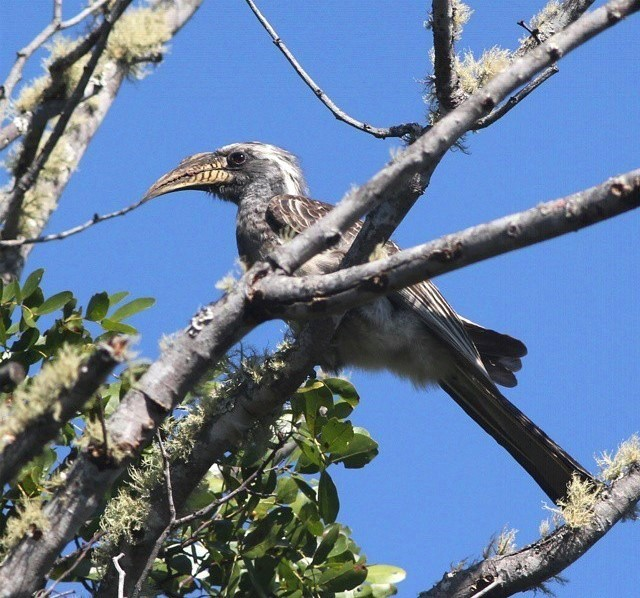
- Male L. p. subsp. pallidirostris in Angola
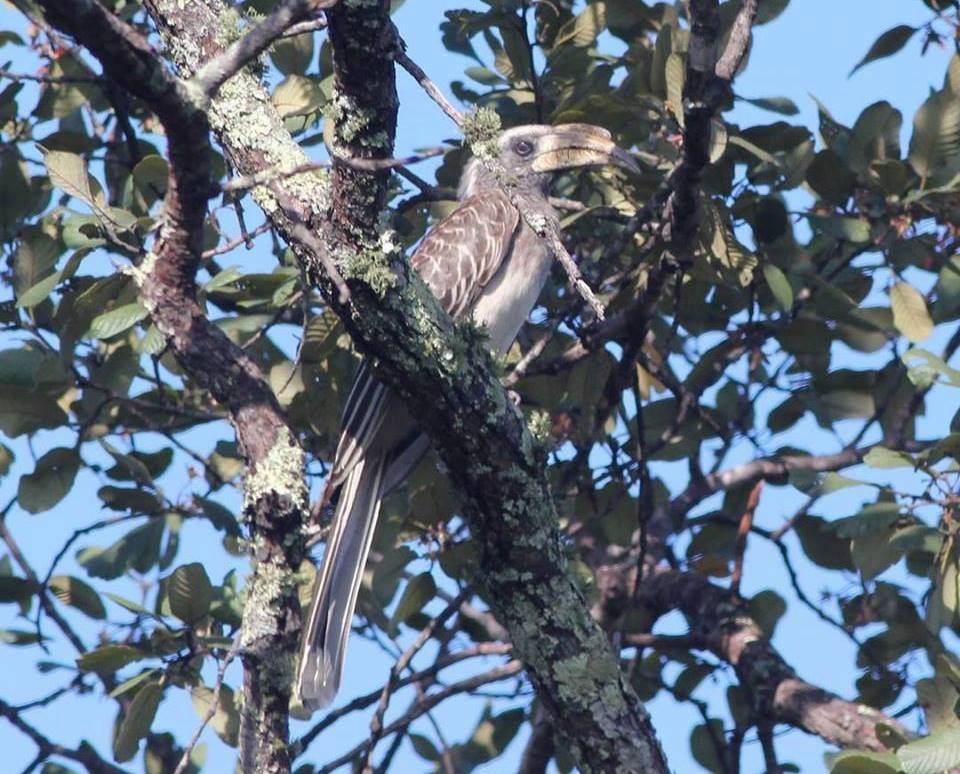
- Female L. p. subsp. pallidirostris in Angola

Conservation status
- Least Concern (IUCN 3.1)

Scientific classification
- Kingdom: Animalia
- Phylum: Chordata
- Class: Aves
- Order: Bucerotiformes
- Family: Bucerotidae
- Genus: Lophoceros
- Species: L. pallidirostris

Binomial name
- Lophoceros pallidirostris (Hartlaub & Finsch, 1870)
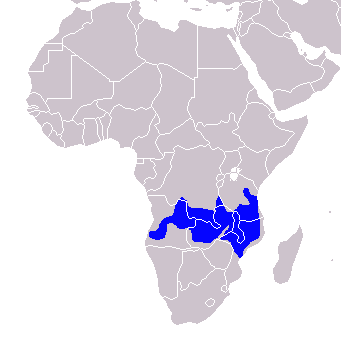
- approximate distribution

Synonyms
- Tockus pallidirostris

= Pale-billed hornbill =

Species of bird

The pale-billed hornbill (Lophoceros pallidirostris) is a species of hornbill in the family Bucerotidae. It is found in Angola, DRC, Kenya, Malawi, Mozambique, Tanzania, and Zambia.
