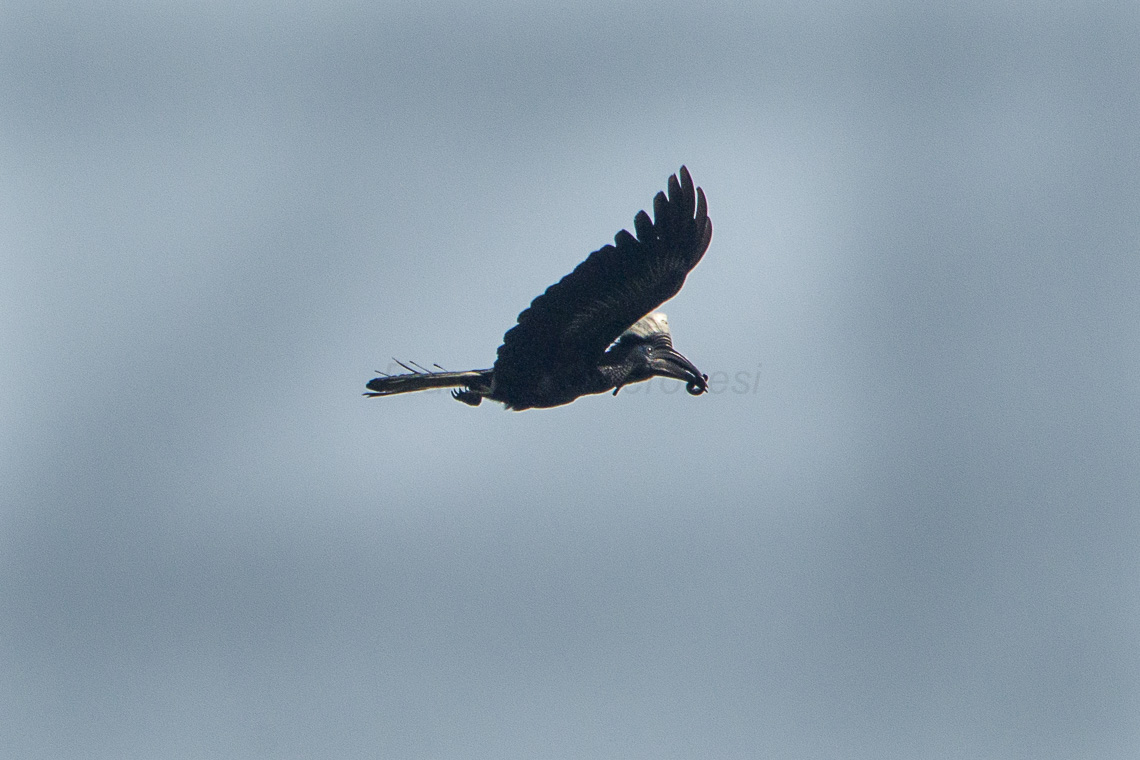
- Ankasa Conservation Area, Ghana

Conservation status
- Vulnerable (IUCN 3.1)

Scientific classification
- Kingdom: Animalia
- Phylum: Chordata
- Class: Aves
- Order: Bucerotiformes
- Family: Bucerotidae
- Genus: Ceratogymna
- Species: C. elata

Binomial name
- Ceratogymna elata (Temminck, 1831)

= Yellow-casqued hornbill =

Species of bird

The yellow-casqued hornbill (Ceratogymna elata), also known as the yellow-casqued wattled hornbill, is found in the rainforest of coastal regions of West Africa, for example in Côte d'Ivoire. It is threatened by habitat loss.

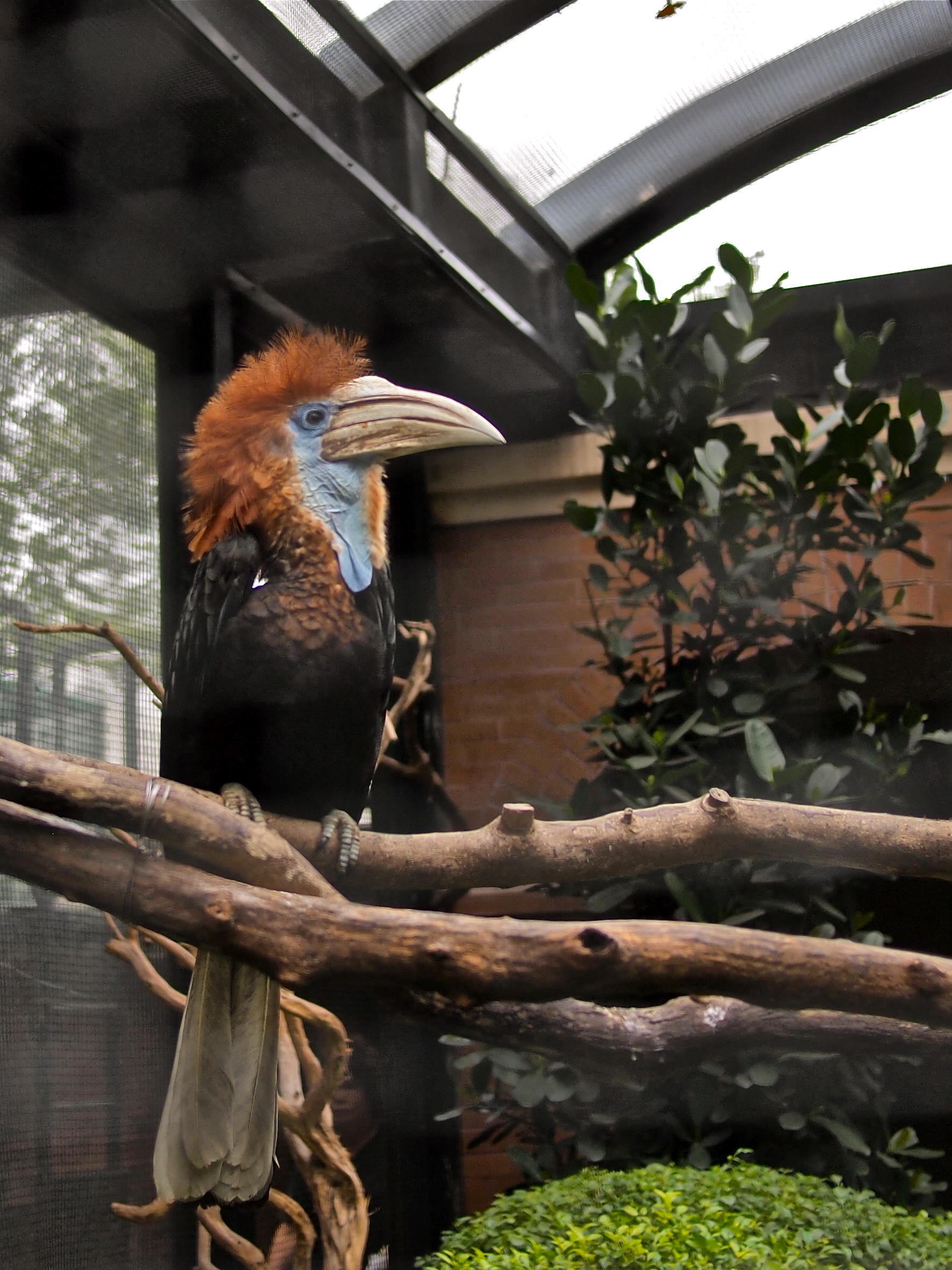
A female at Hong Kong Zoological and Botanical Gardens

The yellow-casqued hornbill is one of the largest birds of the West African forest, with adults weighing up to two kilograms (4 1/2 pounds). They live mainly in the forest canopy, rarely feeding on the ground. They live in small family groups containing at least one adult male and female, with one or two immature birds, though they sometimes gather in larger flocks to exploit a major food supply such as an ant or termite nest.

The birds are occasionally preyed upon by crowned hawk-eagles, and they respond to the presence of an eagle (sometimes indicated by its characteristic shriek) by mobbing – approaching it and emitting calls. Since the eagles depend on surprise to make a catch, this frequently causes them to leave the area. Recent research (Rainey et al., 2004) has shown that the birds respond in the same way to the alarm calls that Diana monkeys, which live in the same areas, emit if they notice an eagle, and that they can distinguish the calls made by the monkeys in the presence of eagles from those they make in the presence of leopards, which prey on the monkeys but not on the hornbills.
