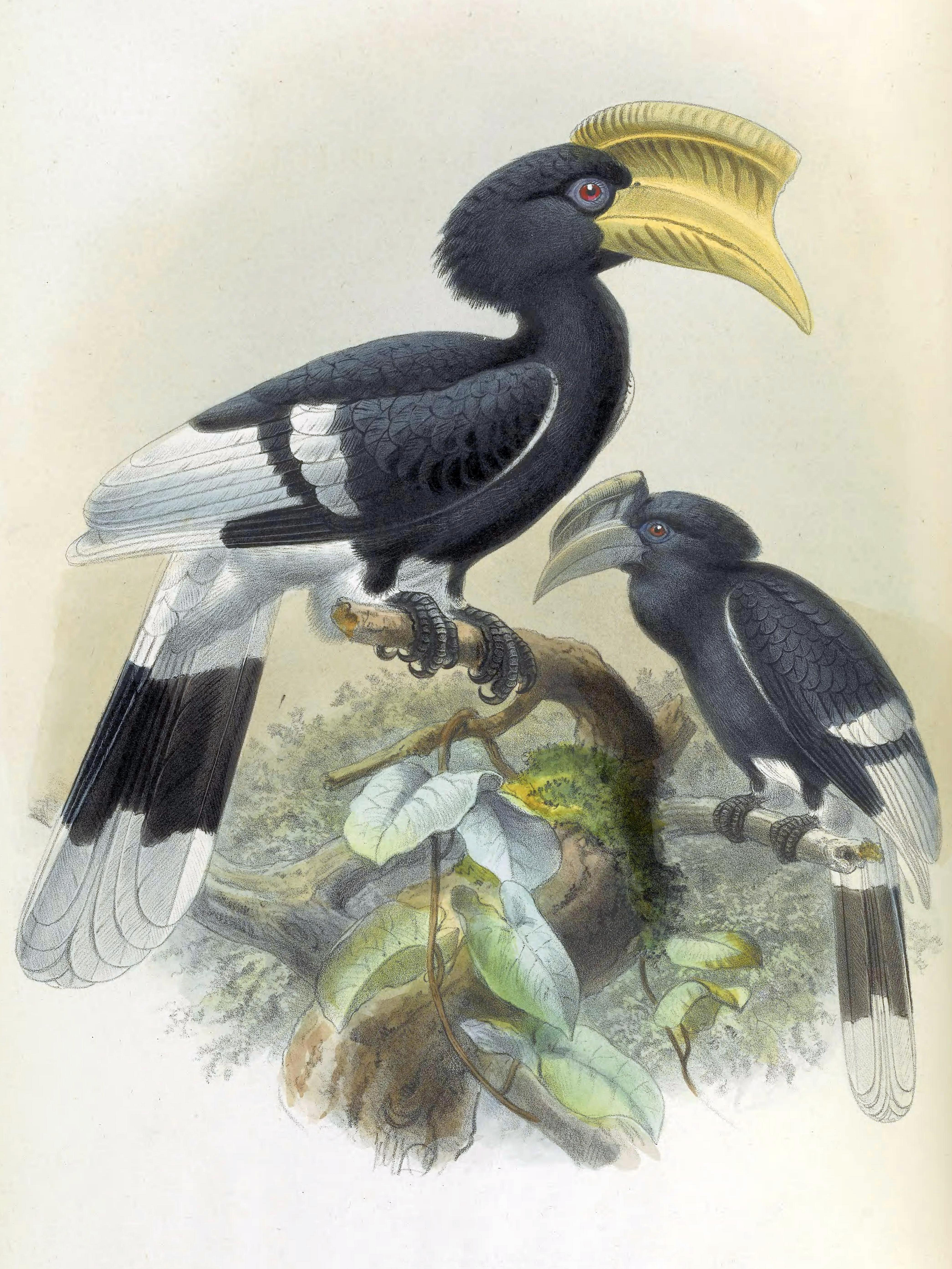
- Illustration from "A monograph of the Bucerotidæ, or family of the hornbills" (1882)

Conservation status
- Vulnerable (IUCN 3.1)

Scientific classification
- Kingdom: Animalia
- Phylum: Chordata
- Class: Aves
- Order: Bucerotiformes
- Family: Bucerotidae
- Genus: Bycanistes
- Species: B. cylindricus

Binomial name
- Bycanistes cylindricus (Temminck, 1831)

Synonyms
- Ceratogymna cylindricus (Temminck, 1824)

= Brown-cheeked hornbill =

Species of bird

The brown-cheeked hornbill (Bycanistes cylindricus) is a species of hornbill in the family Bucerotidae. It is found in Ivory Coast, Ghana, Guinea, Liberia, Sierra Leone, and Togo. Its natural habitats are tropical and subtropical moist broadleaf forests, plantations, and secondary growth forests. It is threatened by habitat destruction, as timber is harvested and the forests become increasingly fragmented.

== Description ==
The brown-cheeked hornbill is a large bird, measuring 60 to 70 cm (24 to 28 in) in length. The male has a large yellow, down-curving beak topped by a casque, a hollow structure attached to the upper mandible. The head, upper parts and underparts are black apart from the reddish-brown cheeks, and the white rump, belly and tail. The female is smaller but otherwise similar to the male apart from having a black beak and casque. Its call is a descending series of coarse croaks "rrah...rrah...rrah...rrah" or "rack kack kak-kak".

== Distribution and habitat ==
The brown-cheeked hornbill is native to the Upper Guinean forests region of tropical West Africa, its range including southern Guinea, Sierra Leone, Liberia, Ivory Coast, southwestern Ghana and Togo. These forests are moist deciduous, semi-evergreen mixed forests, typically containing a range of tree species, some of which drop their leaves during the dry season. It is also found in mature second-growth forest.

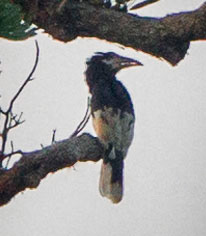
On branch

== Ecology ==
The brown-cheeked hornbill covers large distances while foraging in the forest. It feeds on fruits and is an excellent disperser of the seeds, which may be deposited as far from their origin as 6.9 km (4.3 mi). Many forest trees have large seeds, and any decrease in the populations of frugivorous birds like the brown-cheeked hornbill is likely to impact adversely on the dispersal of seeds and the regeneration of forest. This hornbill also feeds on insects, which it catches on the wing. It nests in cavities in trees some 20 m (66 ft) above the ground, and may be dependent on there being large trees, alive or dead, for suitable nesting sites. Breeding may not take place every year.

== Status ==
The fragmentation of the forest and the removal of timber deprives this bird of the habitat it needs in order to find sufficient fruit. The brown-cheeked hornbill is one of the first species of hornbill to disappear following timber extraction. Many of the forested areas within its range have disappeared, being replaced by agricultural land and oil palm and other plantations, however it is present in a number of protected areas. Hunting the birds for sale as live birds or for use as bushmeat is a significant threat for hornbills, and because of their low reproductive rate, species like the brown-cheeked hornbill are put at risk by this practice. For these reasons, the International Union for Conservation of Nature has assessed the conservation status of this species as "vulnerable".
