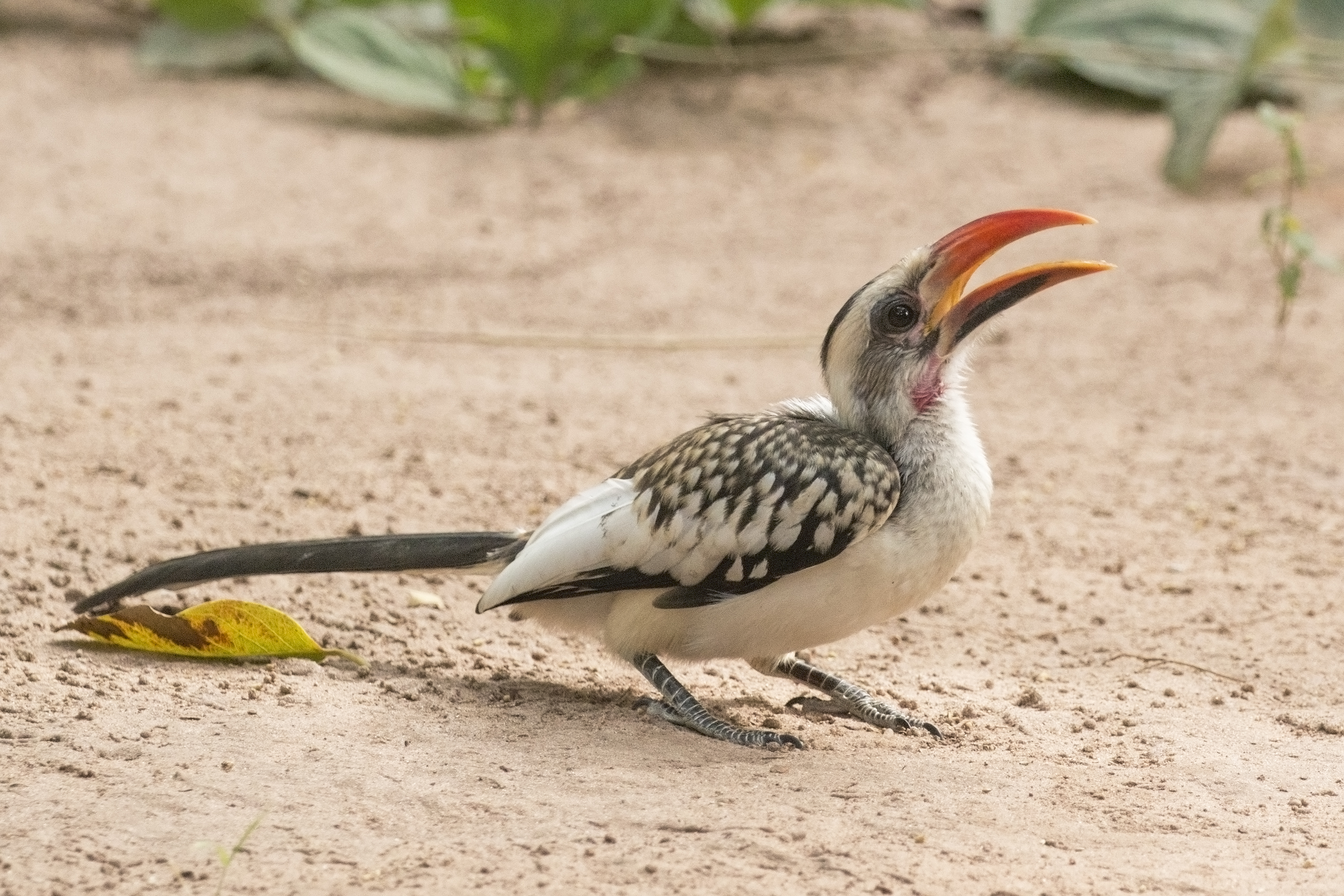
- Male in Gambia

Scientific classification
- Kingdom: Animalia
- Phylum: Chordata
- Class: Aves
- Order: Bucerotiformes
- Family: Bucerotidae
- Genus: Tockus
- Species complex: Tockus erythrorhynchus complex
- Species: T. kempi

Binomial name
- Tockus kempi Tréca & Érard, 2000

= Western red-billed hornbill =

Species of bird

The western red-billed hornbill (Tockus kempi) is a species of hornbill in the family Bucerotidae. Hornbills are known for their unique breeding behaviour whereby the females seals themselves in a tree or rock cavity during incubation and chick rearing. There are five species in the red-billed hornbill species group, though some authorities still recognize them as subspecies of the northern red-billed hornbill. The western red-billed hornbill is found in Senegal and Gambia ranging east in northern Guinea and western Mali inhabiting open woodlands, riparian forests and thorn-scrubs.

This small hornbill is distinguished from other similar species by being the only one with dark eyes and eye rings. Males and females are similar in size, though males are slightly larger, and similar wing colouration, but may be distinguished by the base of the lower mandible have a black patch on males and it being red on females. Additionally, during incubation, females seal themselves inside the cavity and may be sexed by behaviour. The western red-billed hornbill has a complex basic molting strategy, with two juvenile plumages and one adult plumage. Most individuals molt outside of the breeding period (Aug-June), but females often molt while inside the sealed cavity during incubation and chick rearing. Its vocalization is a series of clucks that increase in frequency and volume and follow into double notes with one sounding slightly hiccup like.

Breeding season runs between November and March, females lay three to six eggs in natural cavities, although nestboxes have been accepted by individuals before. Incubation and brooding is exclusively performed by the female as she is sealed in the cavity, incubation period is approximately 23-25 days, the chicks fledge between ages 39-50 days old.

== Description ==
The western red-billed hornbill is a small and slender hornbill in the genus Tockus. Hornbills are recognized for their prominent downcurved beaks with a helmet-like structure at the top called a casque. However, the western red-billed hornbill has a slight ridge that is not visually distinguishable. It has a bright, long, slender, downcurved orange/red beak, with males having a black spot at the base of the lower mandible, while the females' bill is uniformly orange/red. It has a white chest and a greyish white head with black feathers along the centre back of its head and neck. Under the eyes, it has a large pinkish spot. Like all red-billed hornbills, its wing feathers are black with white circular spots. Shoulders have heavier white spotting. It has a long tail compared to its body size, with inner tail feathers that are black and outer tail feathers that are white. The unique characteristic of the western red-billed hornbill is the black skin around its eye and the black eye colour. It is the only species of red-billed hornbills to have both dark eyes and dark skin around the eyes. The western red-billed hornbill has sexual dimorphism, with males are larger than females on average. Overall length of individuals is 40–48 cm (16–19 in), wing length is 158–176 mm (6.2–6.9 in) for females and 171–185 mm (6.7–7.3 in) for males, tail length is likewise 161–211 mm (6.3–8.3 in) and 178–213 mm (7.0–8.4 in), bill length is 60–77 mm (2.4–3.0 in) and 64–100 mm (2.5–3.9 in), and tarsus length is 26–34 mm (1.0–1.3 in) and 27–39 mm (1.1–1.5 in). On average, females weigh 148 g (5.2 oz) and males weigh 182 g (6.4 oz). However, during incubation when females molt all their flight feathers, their weight can increase by 12% and can surpass the average weight of a male.

== Taxonomy ==
The oldest depiction of a western red-billed hornbill dates back to 1839 where a painting by Travis depicts a red-billed hornbill with the distinctive black skin around the eyes and black eyes. The holotype of the western red-billed hornbill was found by Gérard Morel and Abdou Sakho in 1964. The western red-billed hornbill's taxonomy is still debated, and it is not considered a species by some authorities. The proposal of a new subspecies was in 2000 by Bernard Treca and Christian Erard. They noticed that the black skin around the eyes and the black eyes were distinctive characteristics not seen in individuals in other geographic areas. In the late 1990's mitochondrial DNA analyses, physical and geographical differences in the four subspecies brought about a discussion about giving species status to five populations. Additionally, no hybridizations were reported, further supporting species status. Genetic studies showed that within the five species belonging to the red-billed hornbill group, some were more closely related to each other than others. the study showed that the Damara red-billed hornbill was genetically closer to the southern red-billed hornbill and that the western red-billed hornbill is closest to the Tanzanian red-billed hornbill. In 2002, Kemp proposed that the five species be split until proven wrong. The Integrated Taxonomic Information System and BirdLife International Checklists do not recognize the western red-billed hornbill as a species. However, the IOC world bird list does. The scientific name Tockus kempi is named after Alan Kemp for his contribution to the understanding of the species.

== Habitat and distribution ==
Its distribution is in west Africa, found mainly in Senegal, Gambia and Guinea-Bissau and extending north into Mauritania, east into western and central Mali and south into northern Guinea. Its main habitat are open woodlands, riparian forests, and thorn scrubs. It remains in the same area year-round; it does not migrate. However, it may move in large groups (150-200 birds) during the dry seasons.

== Behaviour ==
=== Vocalization ===
The Macaulay Library contains several recordings and videos of the different vocalizations of this species. The most common vocalization is the male's courtship call which is produced from an exposed and elevated perch. The call consists of repeated clucks which increase in volume and frequency and develops into paired-notes with the first sounding hiccup-like. The other vocalizations are produced during feeding interactions; pipings from chicks begging for food and the female squawking when receiving food from the male.

=== Diet ===
The western red-billed hornbill is a ground forager. It primarily feeds on insects and some vegetable matter. It will walk on the ground and kick and dig through the surface of the ground using its feet and bill, looking for insects. It mainly looks through loose vegetation and earth but will often be found rummaging around animal dung for beetles and fly larvae. Main food sources are beetles, termites, fly larvae, grasshoppers and ants. It may also eat many other invertebrates (butterflies, crickets, centipedes, scorpions) and other animals such as geckos, nestlings and rodents. Similar species such as the eastern yellow-billed hornbill and the Von der Decken's hornbill have mutualistic relationships with mongooses. Mongooses help the hornbills forage for insects by exposing them from their hiding spots and in return the hornbills' alarm call alerts the mongooses when a predator is nearby. This behaviour is not confirmed in the western red-billed hornbill, but some non-academic sources state that it has been observed.

=== Reproduction ===
Hornbills are known for their strange breeding behaviour. Females will seal themselves in cavities for weeks during incubation and chick brooding. The western red-billed hornbill's breeding season is from March to November, beginning 4 to 7 weeks after the rains begin. However, in Ghana, it is reported that it may begin before the rains. It nests in natural tree cavities left from woodpeckers and it has been reported that it can use constructed nest boxes. When the couple has selected a breeding site, they become very territorial of the area. The female will seal herself in using her feces and food scraps, leaving a small slit big enough for the bill to fit, through which she can receive food from the male. The female will lay on average 3 to 6 eggs which she will incubate for 23 to 25 days. During this time, the female will begin molting her flight feathers. When the chicks hatch, the female remains in the cavity with the chicks until the youngest one is 16 to 21 days old, at which point she leaves the cavity and the chicks reseal the hole with their feces and food scraps. Both the male and female will feed the chicks very often (avg 1-17 times per hour). Chicks fledge at 39-50 days old.

== Gallery ==
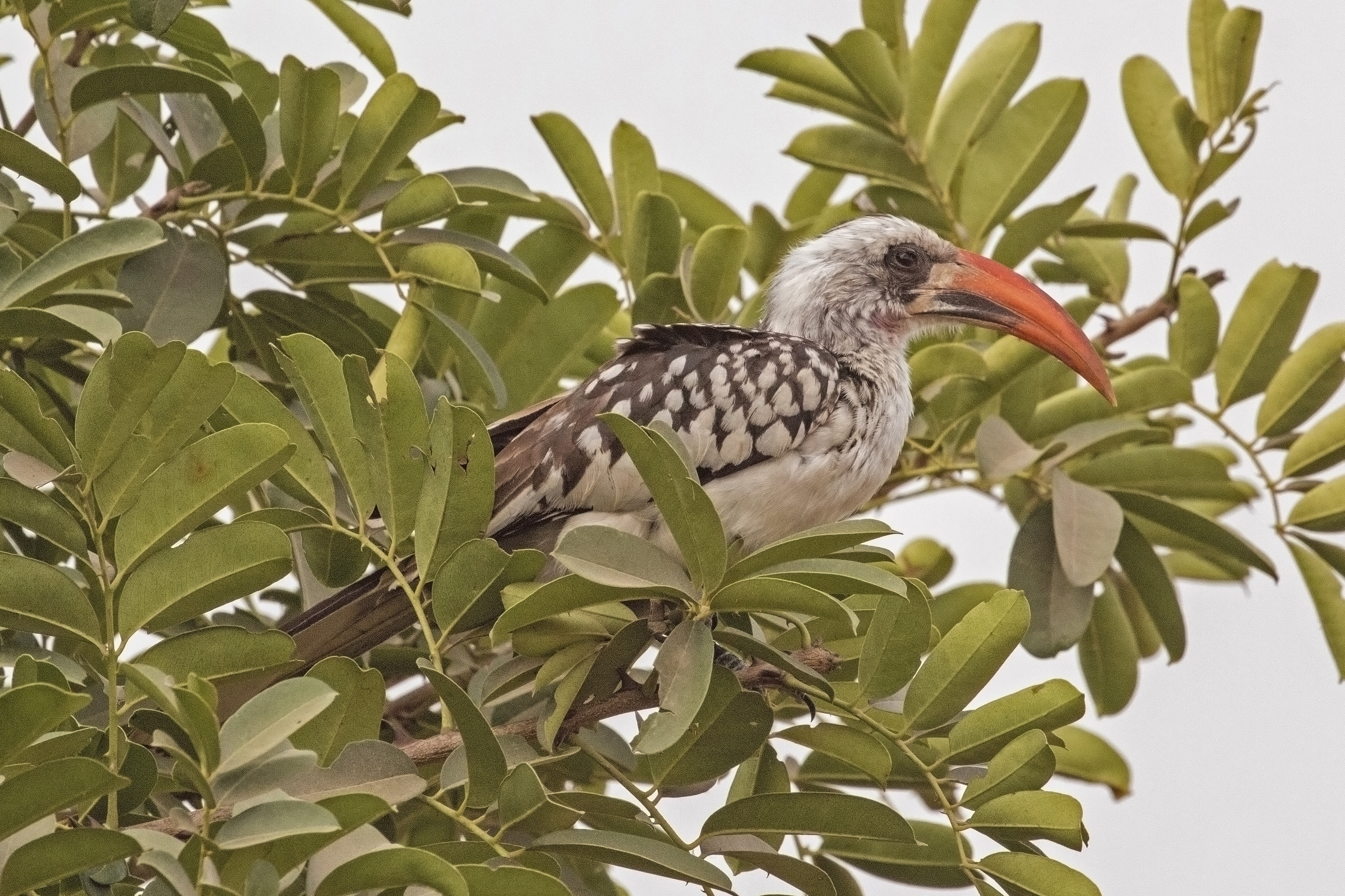
male, Gambia

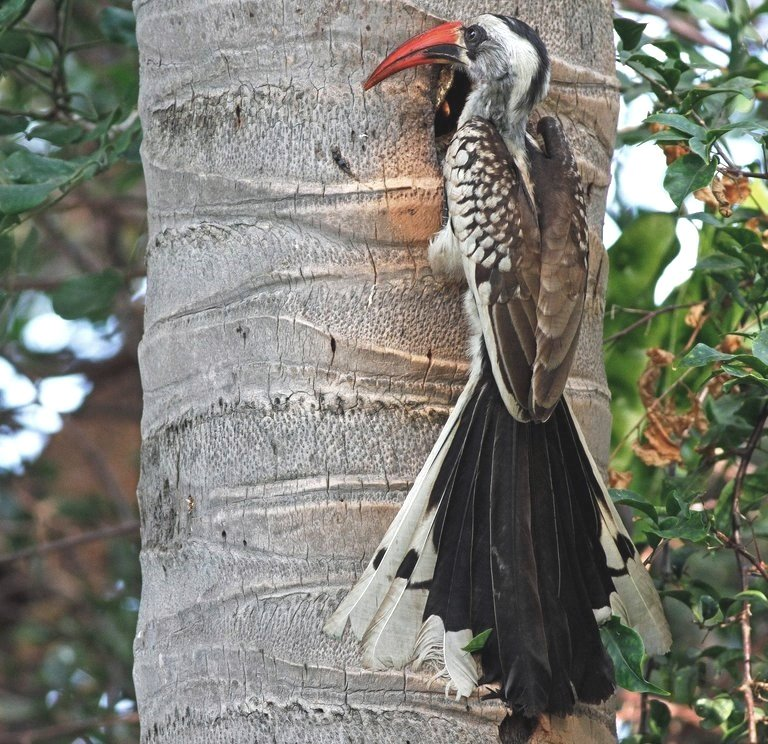
Male at a nest entrance in Gambia
