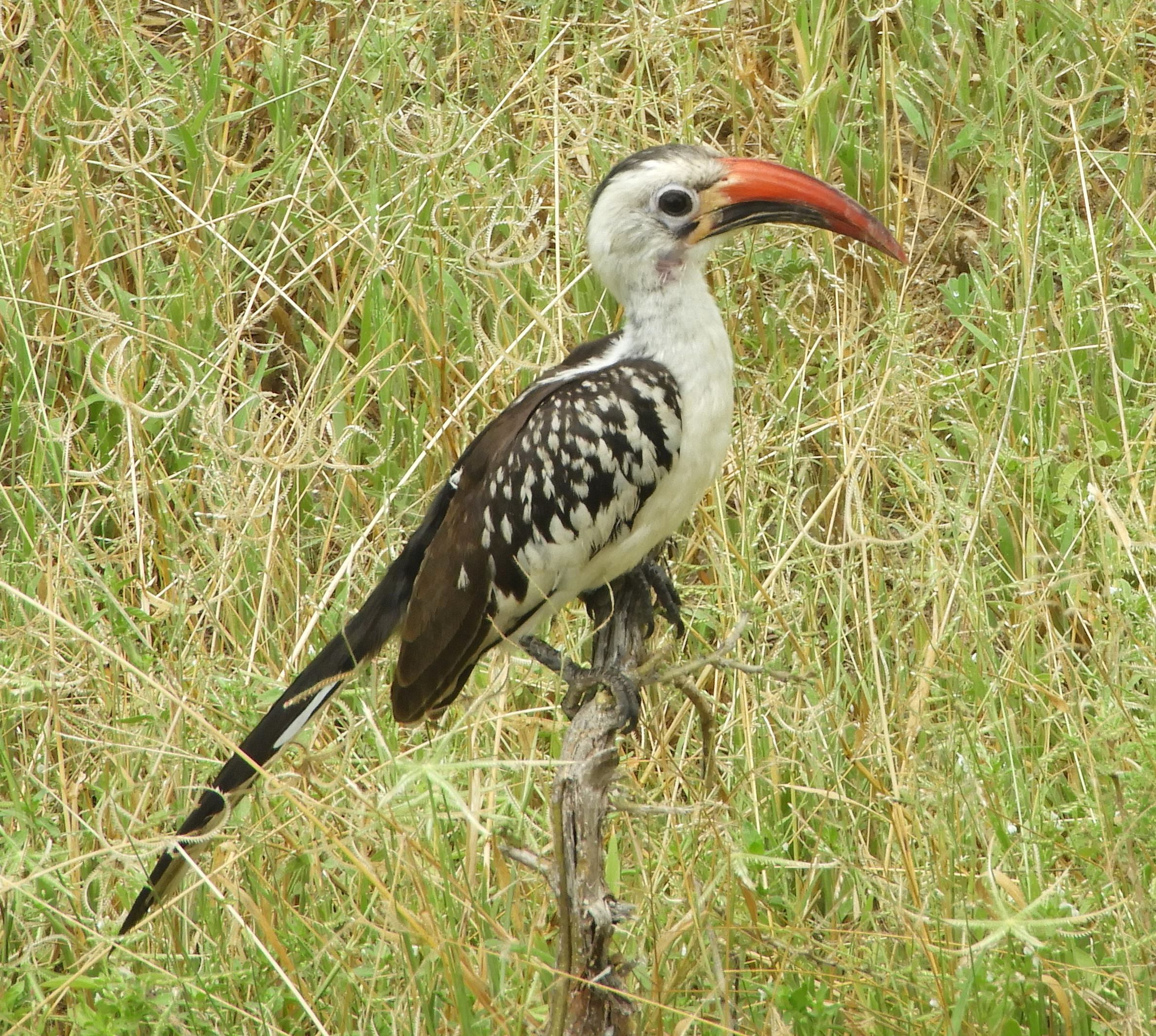
- A northern red-billed hornbill (T. erythrorhynchus) at Tarangire NP

Scientific classification
- Kingdom: Animalia
- Phylum: Chordata
- Class: Aves
- Order: Bucerotiformes
- Family: Bucerotidae
- Genus: Tockus
- Species complex: Tockus erythrorhynchus complex A. C. Kemp & W. Delport 2002

Species
- Tockus rufirostris (Sundevall, 1850); Tockus ruahae Kemp & Delport, 2002; Tockus kempi Tréca & Érard, 2000; Tockus erythrorhynchus (Temminck, 1823); Tockus damarensis (Shelley, 1888)

Audio
- Call of Tockus erythrorhynchus

= Red-billed hornbill =

Group of birds

The red-billed hornbills are a group of hornbills found in the savannas and woodlands of sub-Saharan Africa. They are now usually split into five species, the northern red-billed hornbill (Tockus erythrorhynchus), western red-billed hornbill (T. kempi), Tanzanian red-billed hornbill (T. ruahae), southern red-billed hornbill (T. rufirostris) and Damara red-billed hornbill (T. damarensis), but some authorities consider the latter four all subspecies of Tockus erythrorhynchus.

== Description ==
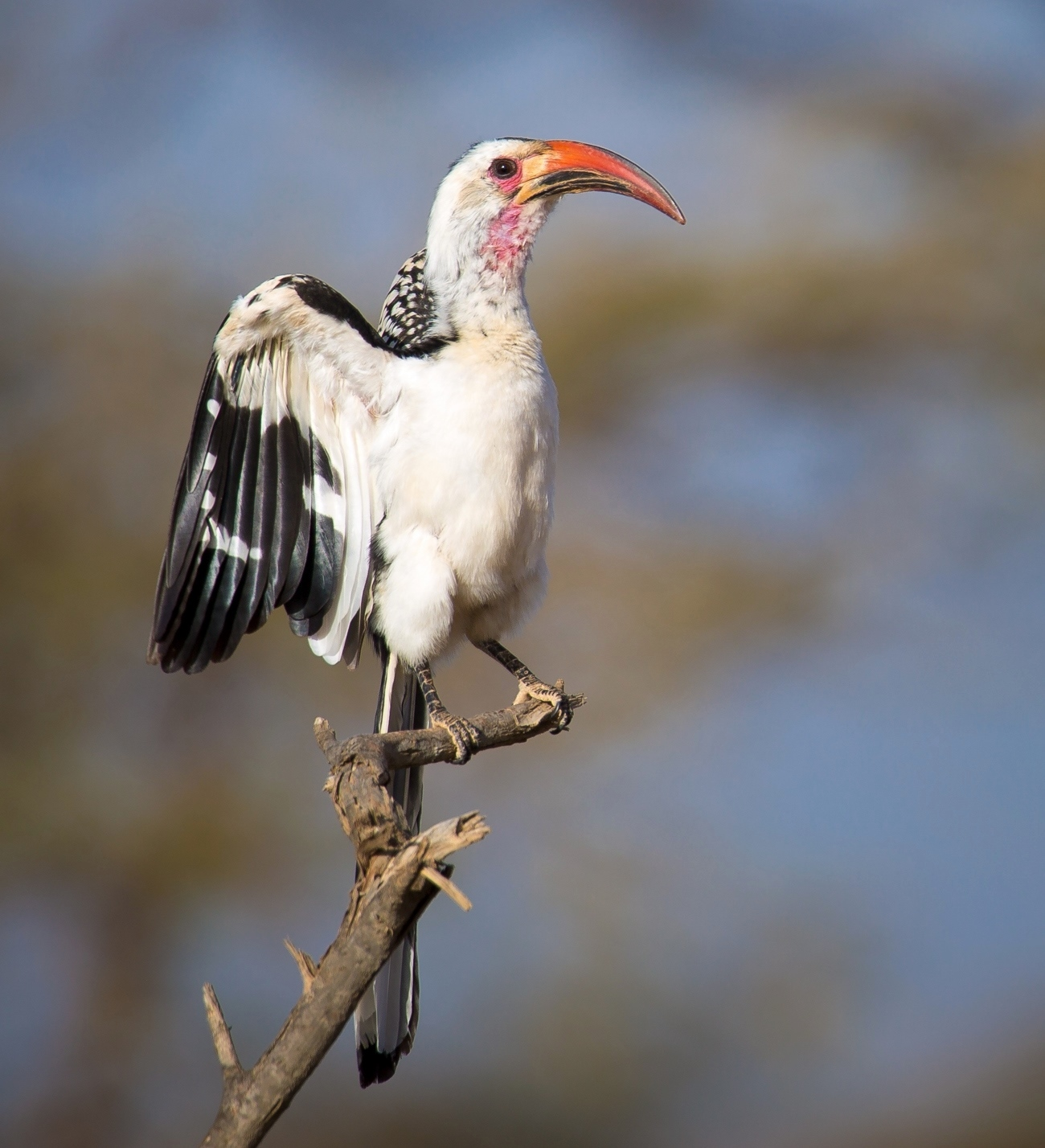
Breeding display at Buffalo Springs National Reserve, Kenya – Tockus rufirostris however, does not lift the wings in display.

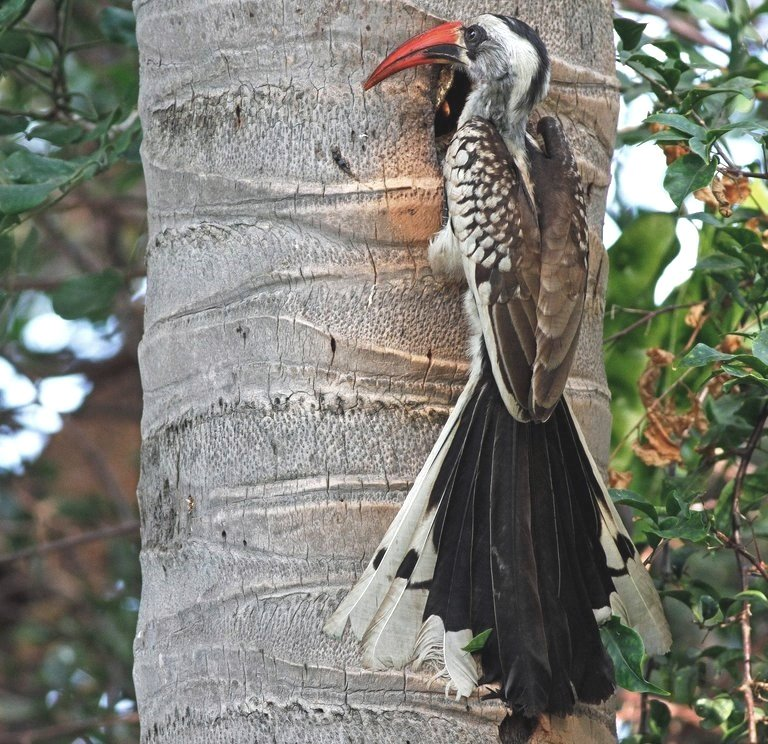
T. kempi at a nest in The Gambia

This group of conspicuous birds have mainly whitish underparts and head, grey upperparts, long tails, and a long curved red bill which lacks a casque. The sexes are similar, but the female has a smaller bill. They are generally large, at 42 centimetres (17 in) long, but the entire group is considered one of the smaller hornbills.

== Behaviour ==
=== Breeding ===
During incubation, the female lays three to six white eggs in a tree hole that has been converted to a nest, which is blocked off with a plaster of mud, droppings and fruit pulp, with her inside, where she remains for a time after the eggs are hatched. The nest is built by both parents. Once the mother is inside the nest, there is only one narrow aperture, just big enough for the male to transfer food gathered from the outside habitat, to the mother and the chicks. When the chicks and the female are too big for the nest, the mother breaks out and rebuilds the wall, leaving the chicks inside for their continued protection from predators. Then both parents continued to feed the chicks.

=== Nesting ===
The female red-billed hornbill protects her young against intruders by building a wall across the opening of her nest. She then seals herself in and brings up her chicks in the enclosed space.

=== Feeding ===
They are omnivorous, taking and eating insects, fruit, seeds and even small rodents. They feed mainly on the ground and will form flocks outside the breeding season.

== Gallery ==
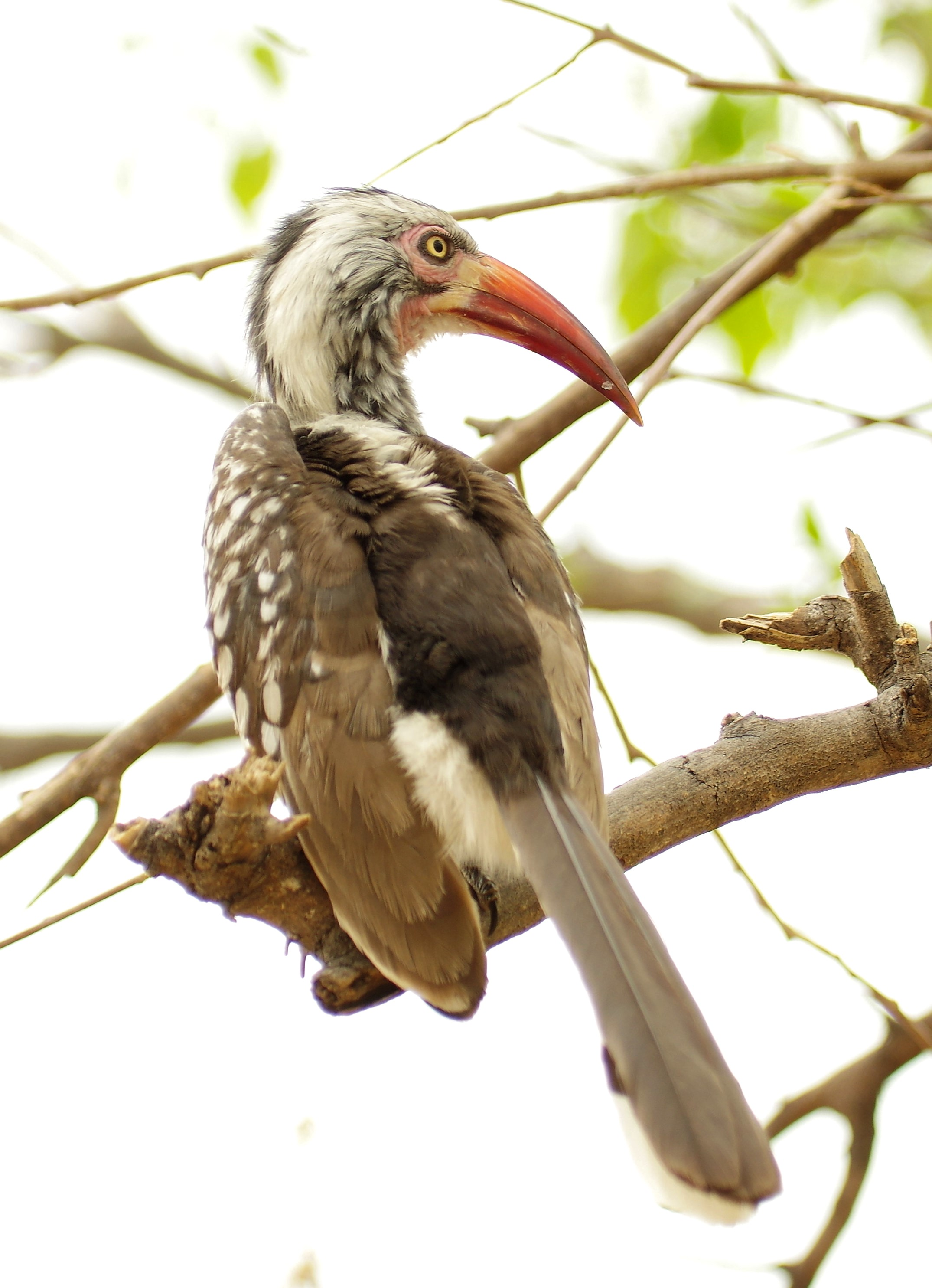
The southern species T. rufirostris is endemic to southern Africa

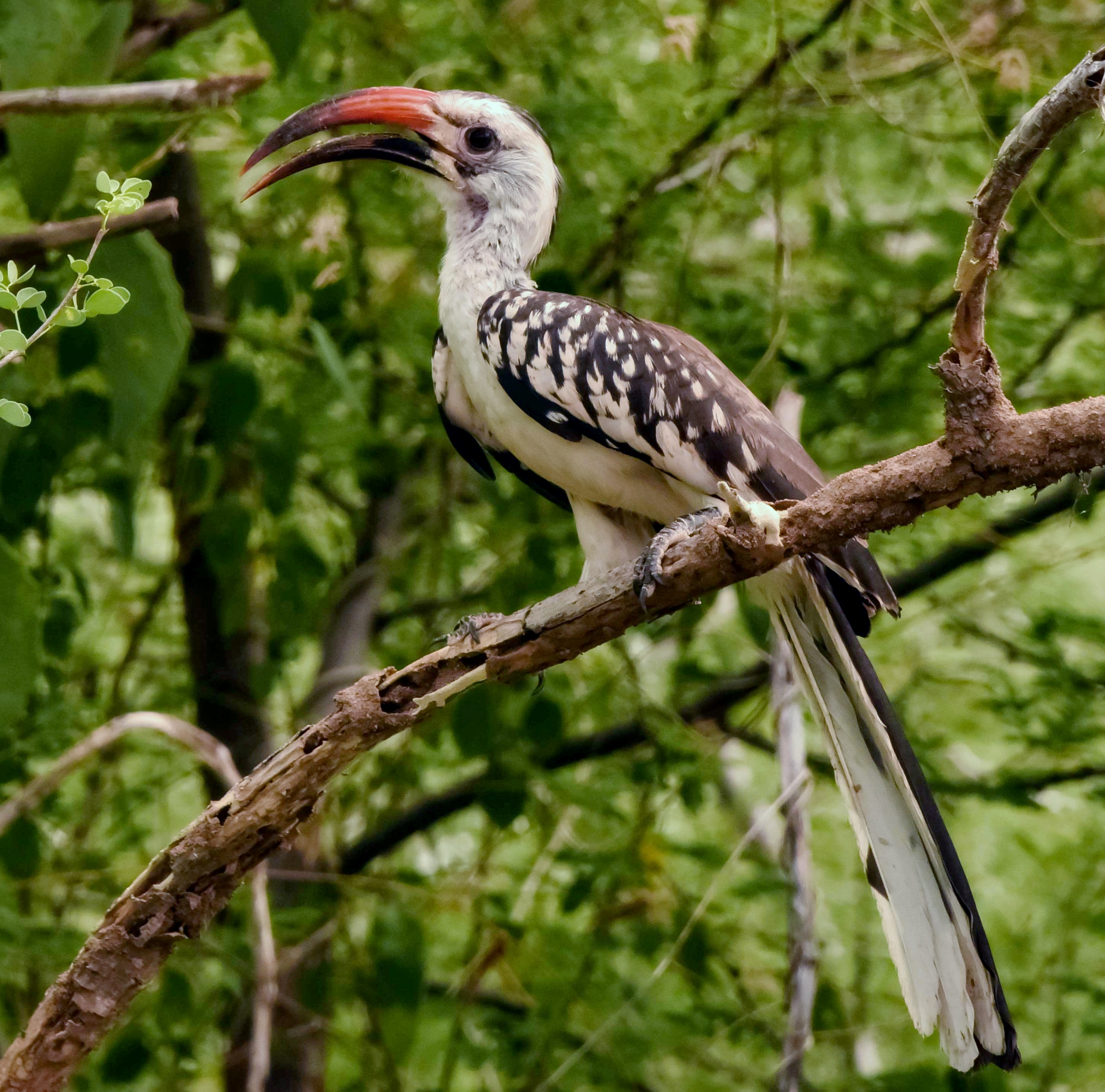
The northern red-billed hornbill has reddish ocular skin and dark eyes.

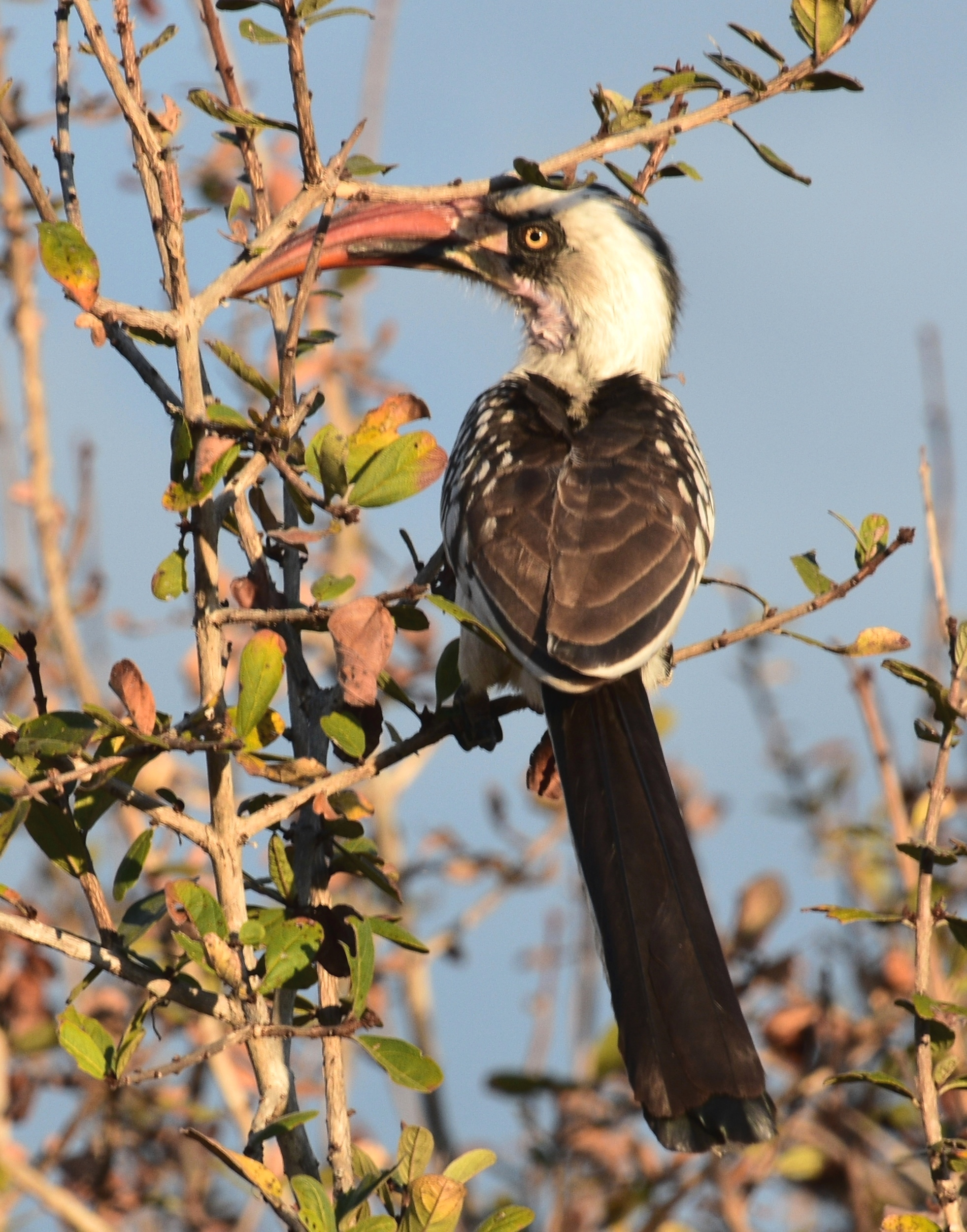
T. ruahae is endemic to Tanzania

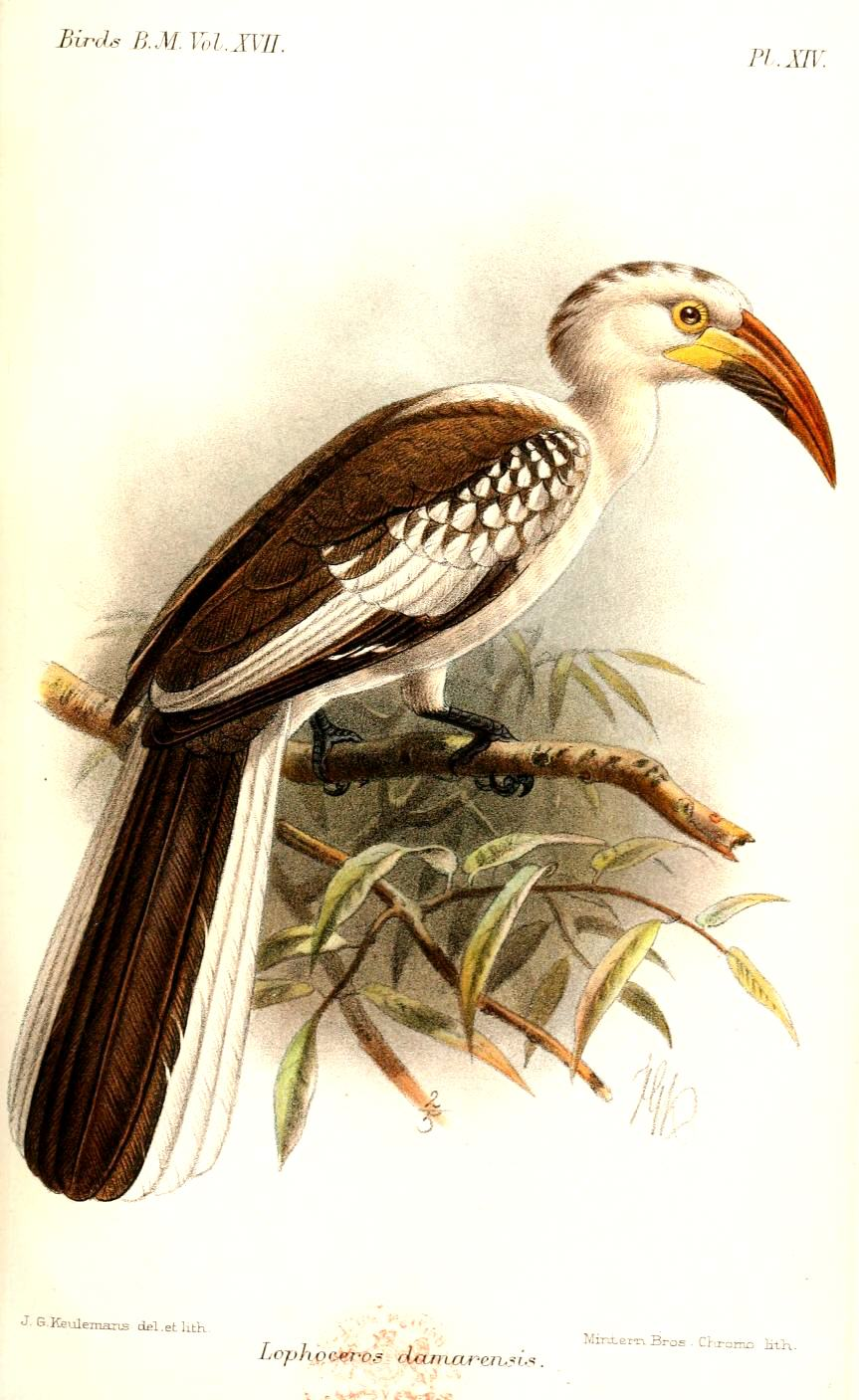
T. damarensis, illustration by Keulemans, 1892

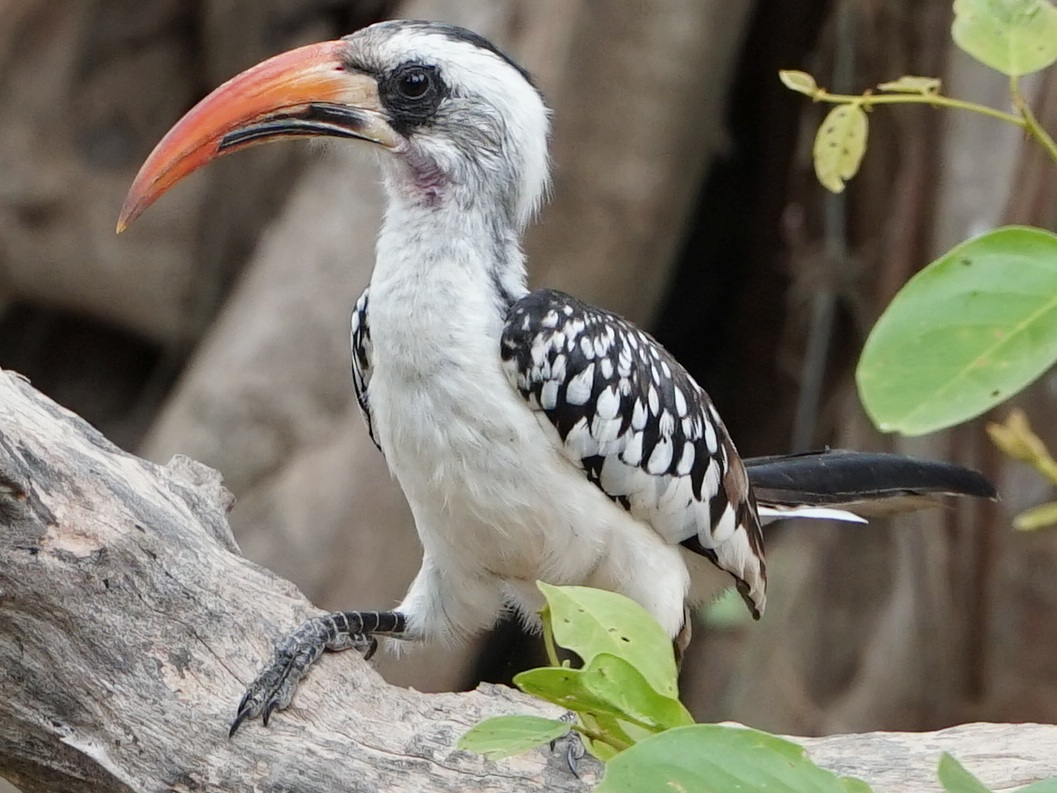
T. kempi of West Africa is the only species with both dark eyes and black ocular skin
