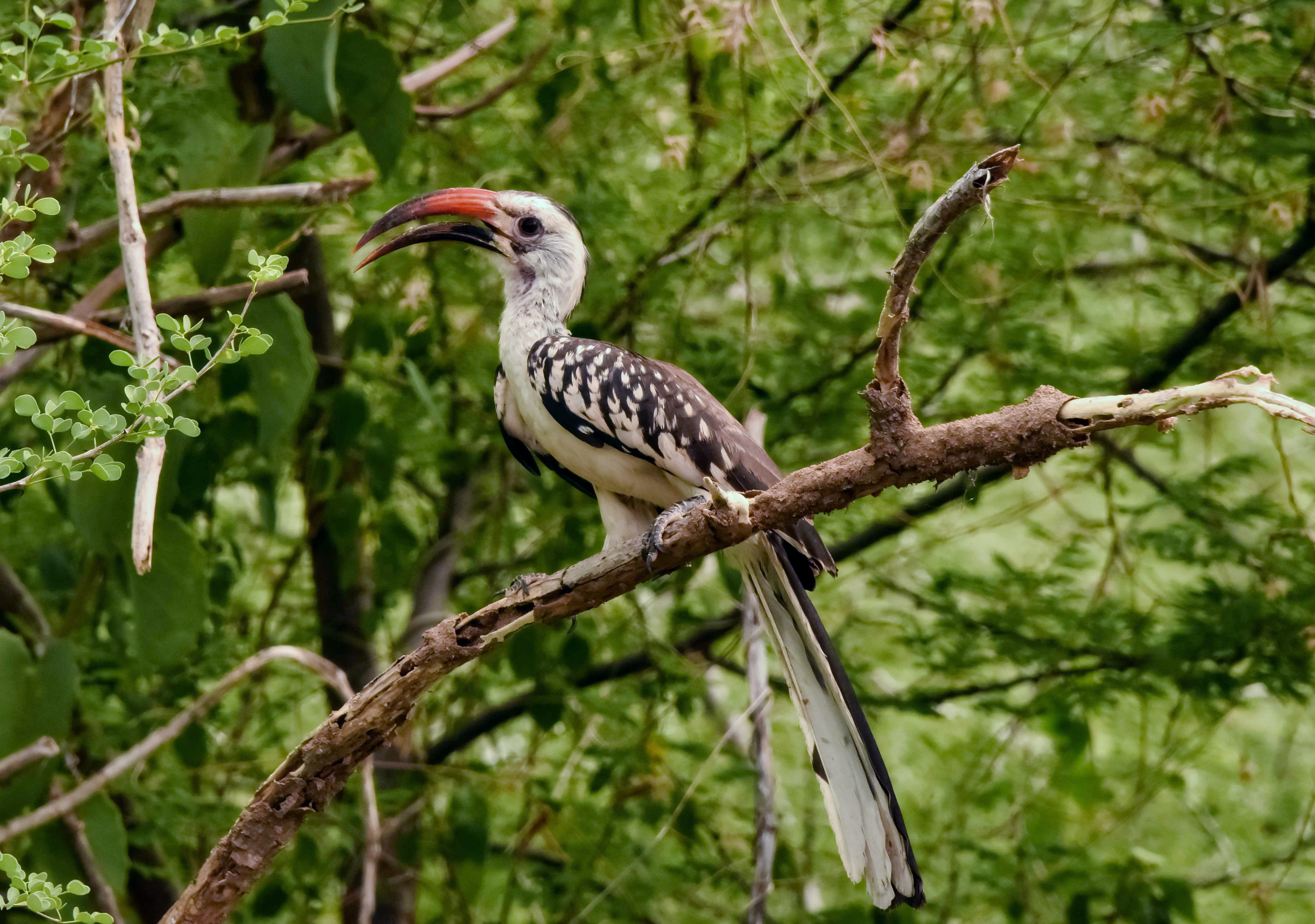

Conservation status
- Least Concern (IUCN 3.1)

Scientific classification
- Kingdom: Animalia
- Phylum: Chordata
- Class: Aves
- Order: Bucerotiformes
- Family: Bucerotidae
- Genus: Tockus
- Species complex: Tockus erythrorhynchus complex
- Species: T. erythrorhynchus

Binomial name
- Tockus erythrorhynchus (Temminck, 1823)
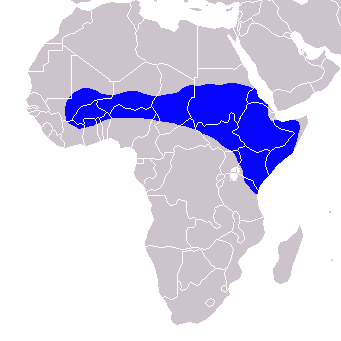

Synonyms
- Alophius erythrorhynchus

= Northern red-billed hornbill =

Species of bird

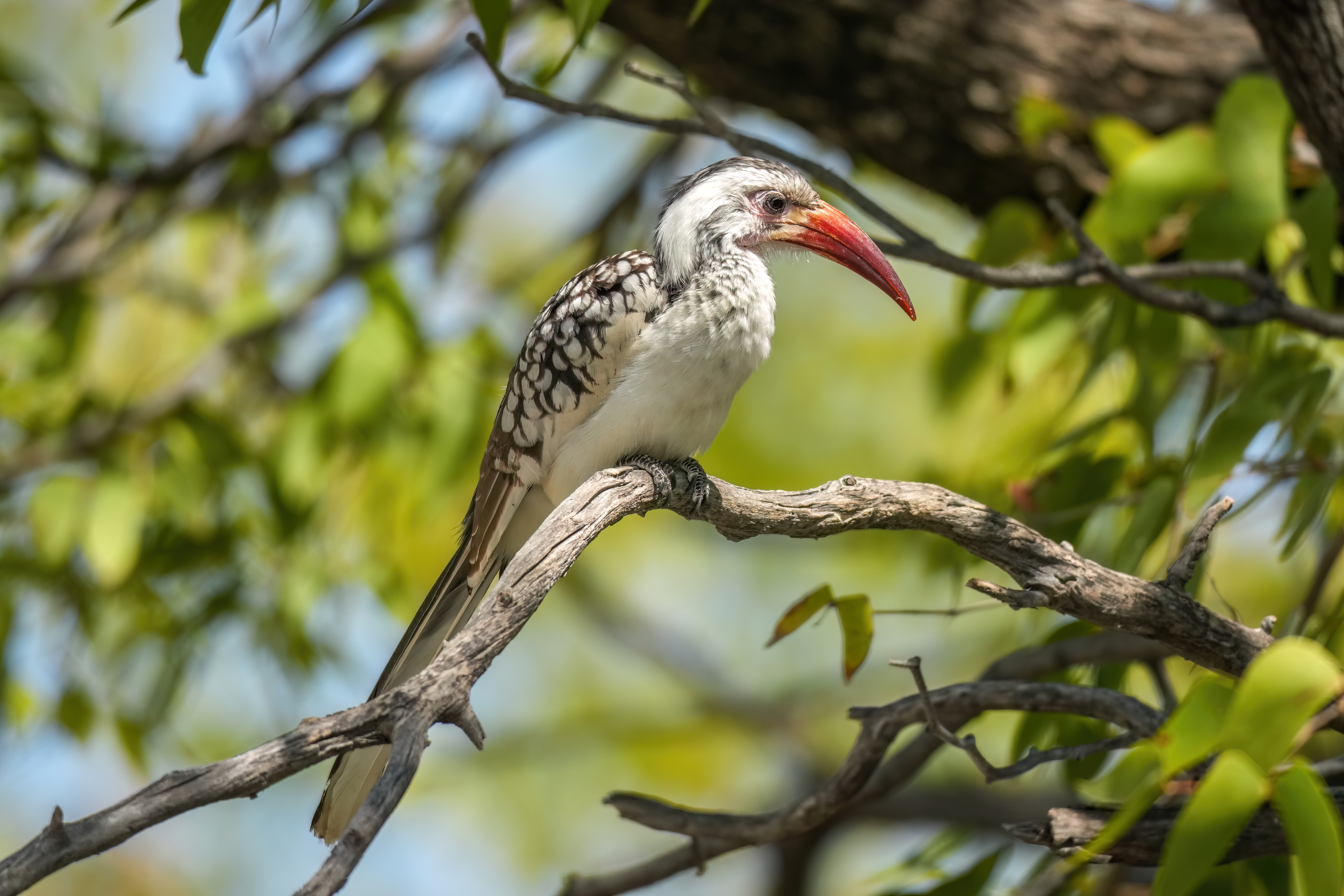
Female, Etosha National Park, Namibia

The northern red-billed hornbill (Tockus erythrorhynchus) is a species of hornbill in the family Bucerotidae. It is found from southern Mauritania through Somalia and northeast Tanzania. There are five species of red-billed hornbills recognized, but all five were once considered conspecific and some authorities still classify the others as subspecies of Tockus erythrorhynchus.

== Gallery ==
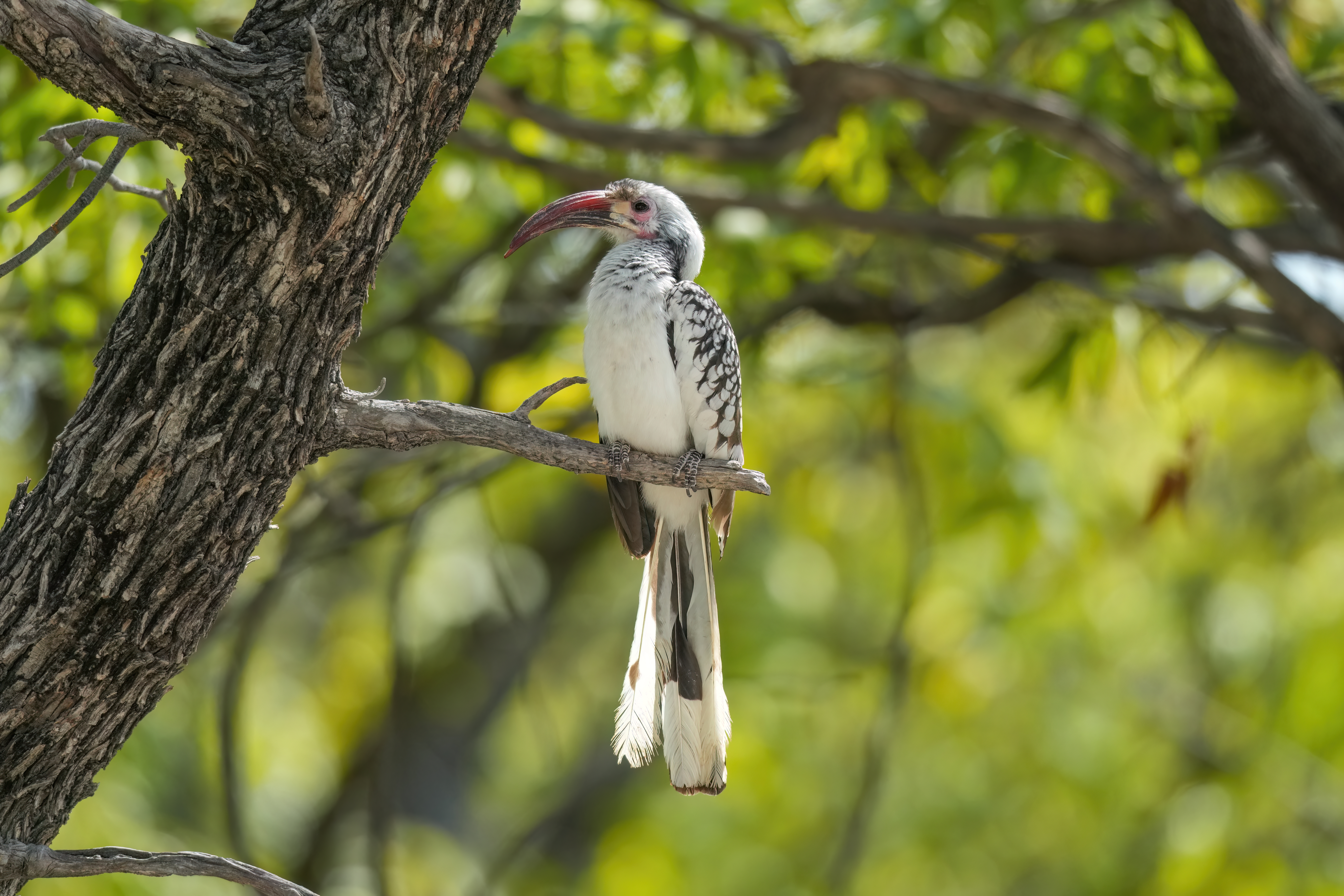
Male, Etosha National Park, Namibia

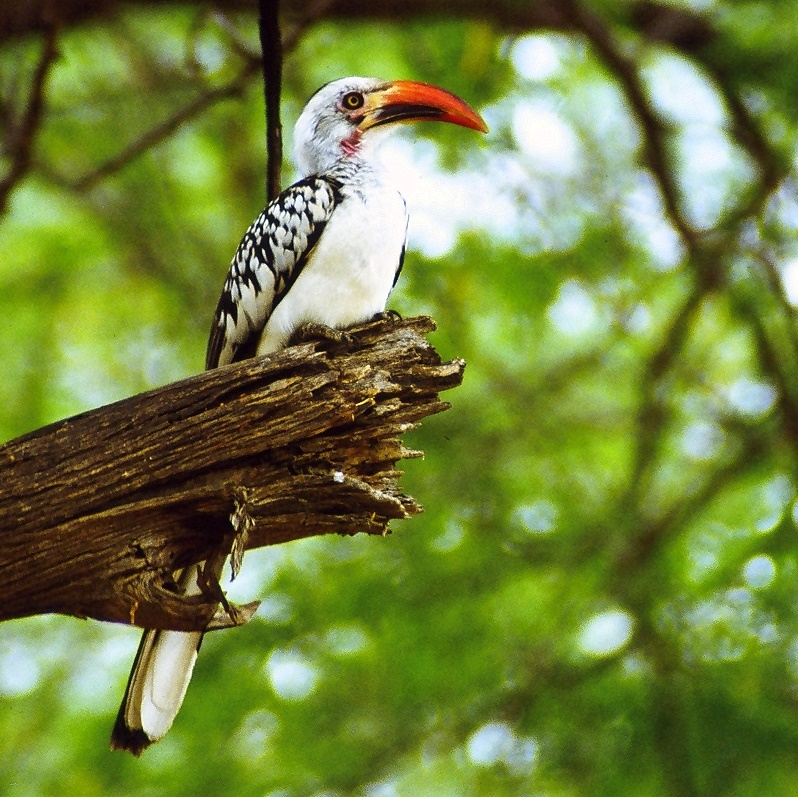
Northern red-billed hornbill

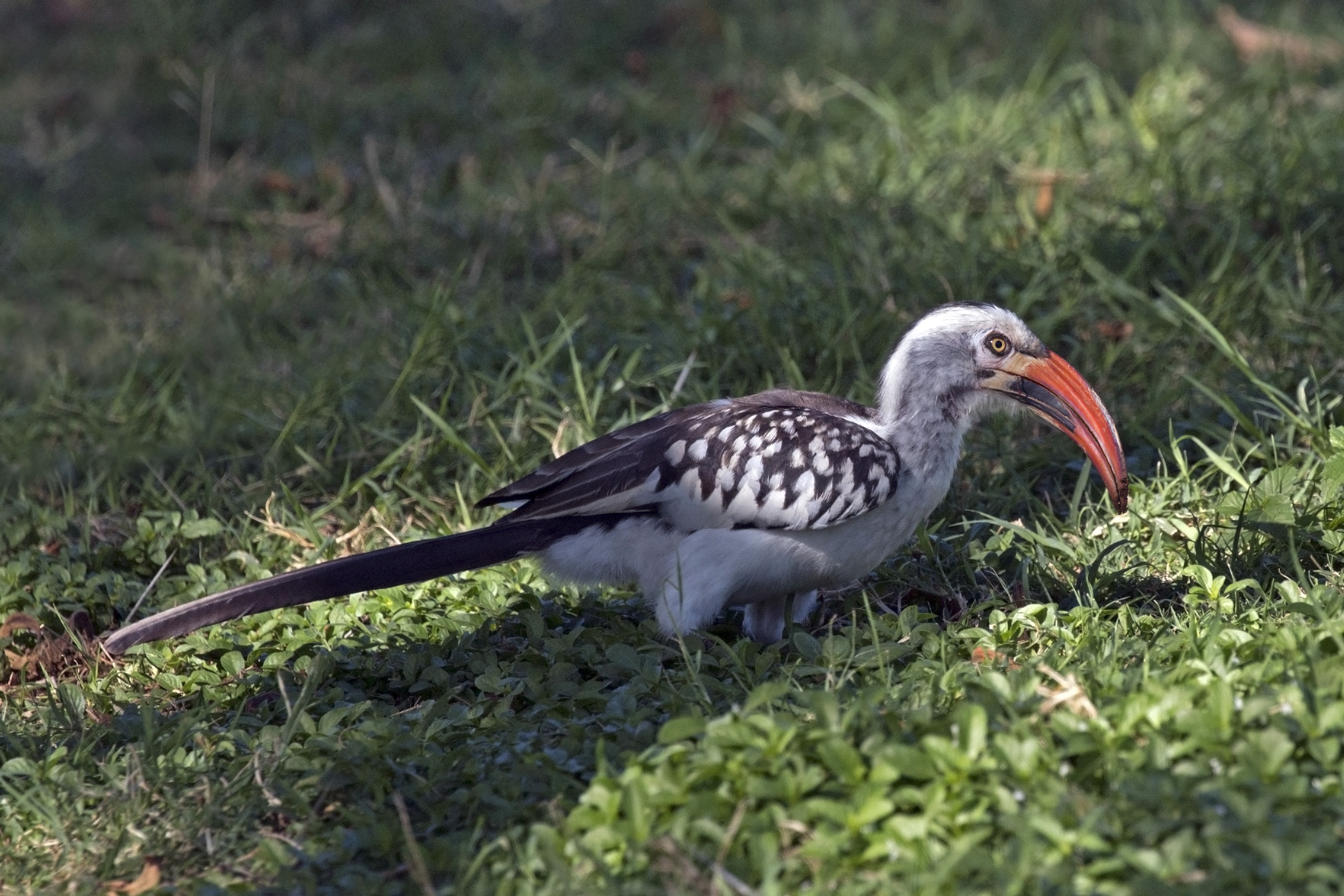
Male, Lake Baringo, Kenya
