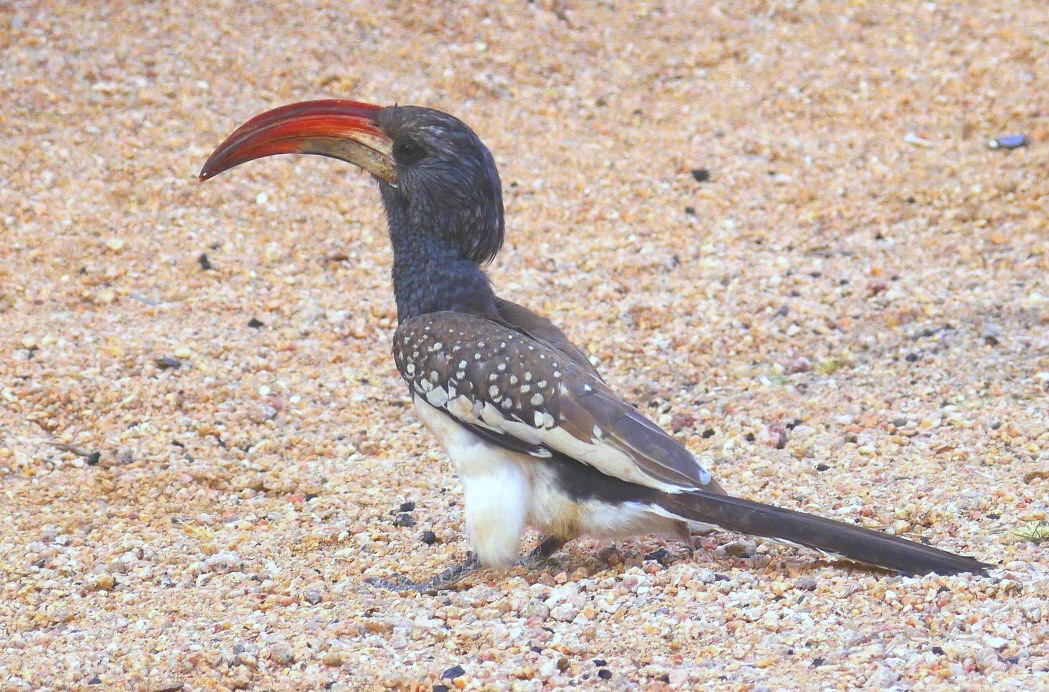
- Adult male at Spitzkoppe, Namibia

Conservation status
- Least Concern (IUCN 3.1)

Scientific classification
- Kingdom: Animalia
- Phylum: Chordata
- Class: Aves
- Order: Bucerotiformes
- Family: Bucerotidae
- Genus: Tockus
- Species: T. monteiri

Binomial name
- Tockus monteiri Hartlaub, 1865
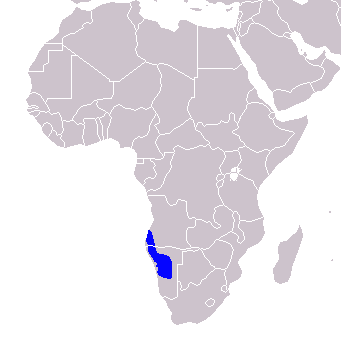
- resident range

= Monteiro's hornbill =

Species of hornbill

Monteiro's hornbill (Tockus monteiri) is a species of hornbill that is native to the dry woodlands of southwestern Africa. It is a common, near-endemic species in Namibia, with a total population estimated at 340,000 individuals.

== Description ==
It is a medium-sized bird, 54–58 cm (21–23 in) in length. With a body mass of 210 to 400 g (7.4 to 14.1 oz), it appears to be the largest hornbill of the relatively diminutive Tockus genus. The species is characterized by a white belly, black back, with white spots on the wings and white secondary flight feathers. The outer feathers of the long tail are also white. Females are smaller than males and can be recognized by their turquoise facial skin. The eyes are black and the beak is red.

== Range and habitat ==
Its habitat is the savannah and dry thornveldt of northwestern Namibia and southwestern Angola.

== Habits ==
Unlike other hornbills, which are omnivorous, the Monteiro's hornbill feeds exclusively on insects and other small arthropods. In springtime, Monteiro's hornbills migrate to the southern Windhoek region to nest. They are adapted to the arid environment, and drinking is not a vital necessity for them. They breed at the end of a good rainy season, laying 3 to 5 greyish-white eggs, which hatch after about 45 days. The nest is built on rock faces or in trees.

== Gallery ==
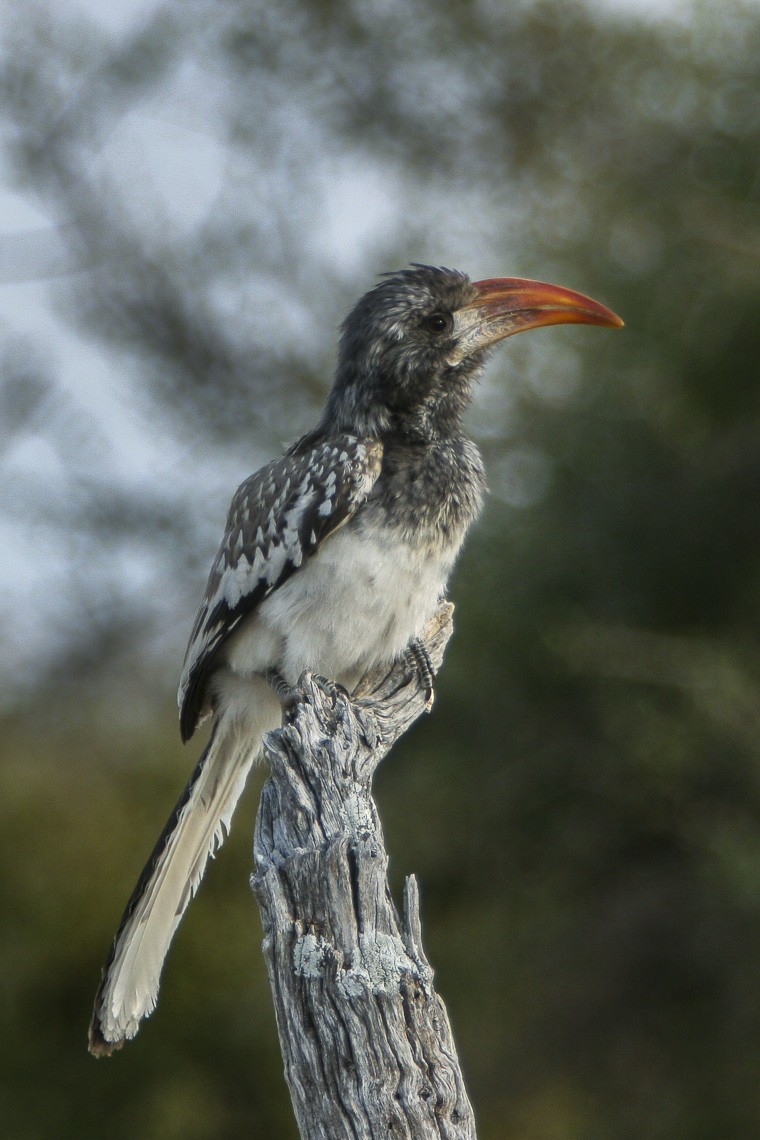
Immature bird in Namibia

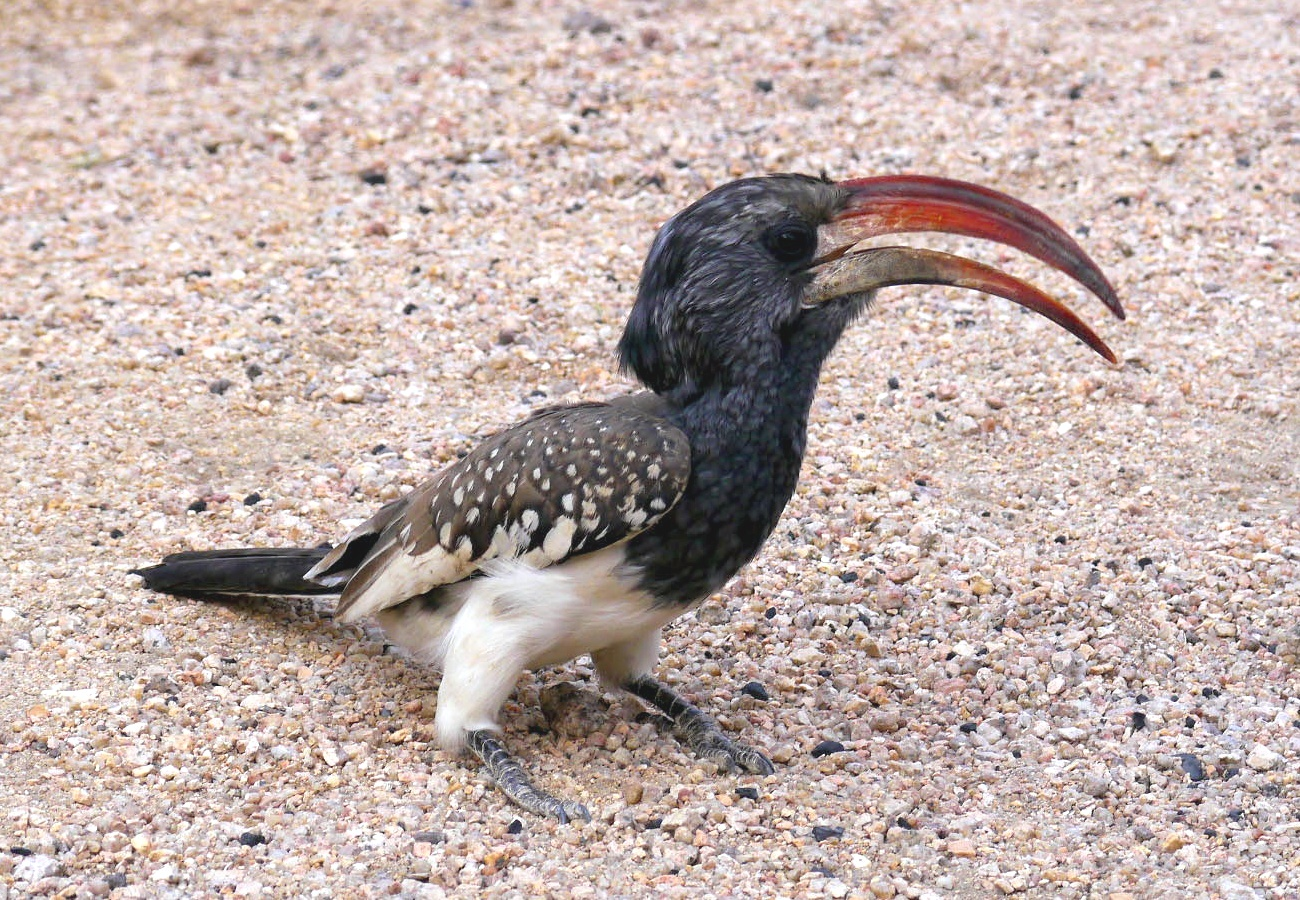
Adult male at Spitzkoppe, Namibia

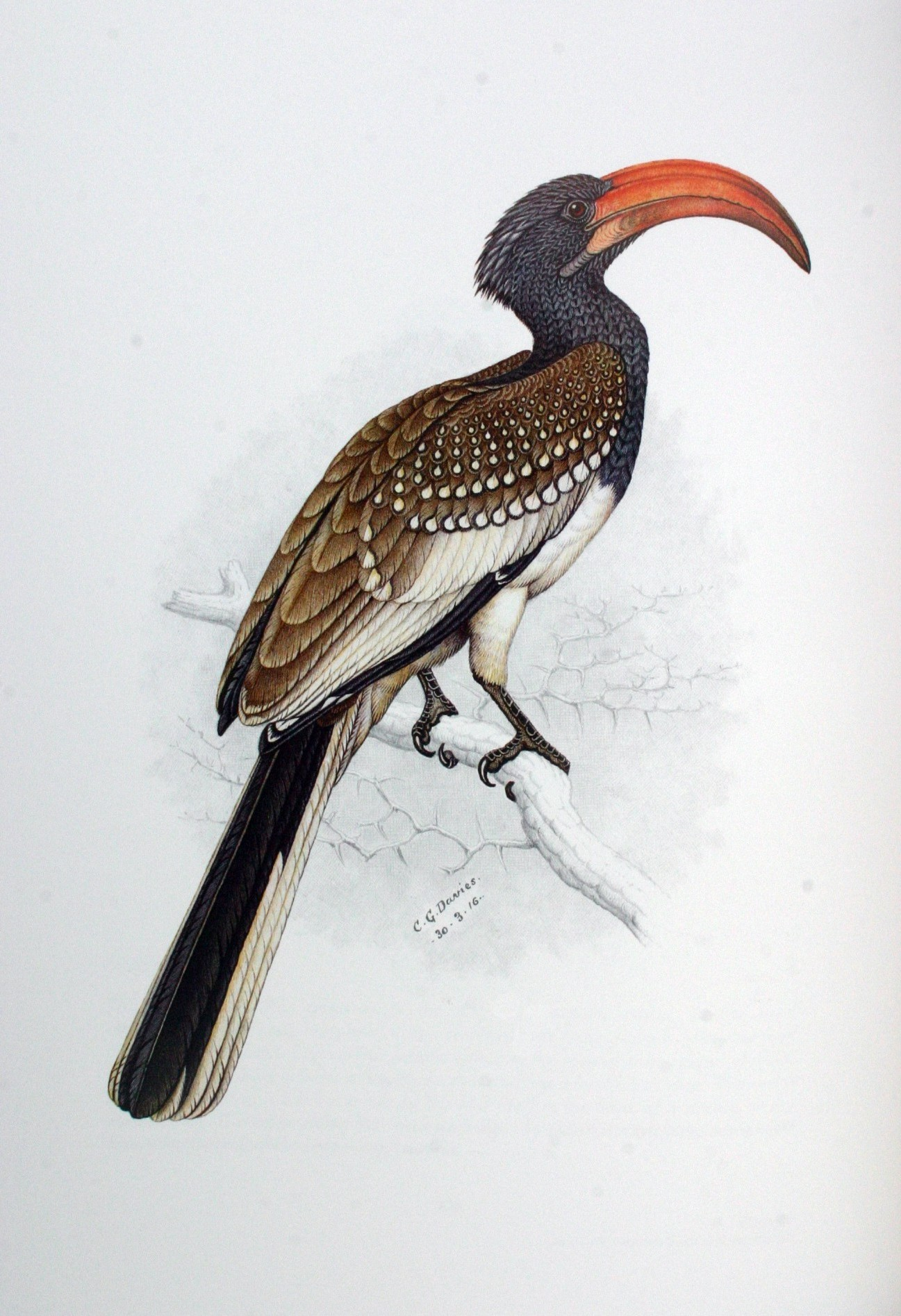
Illustration by Finch-Davies

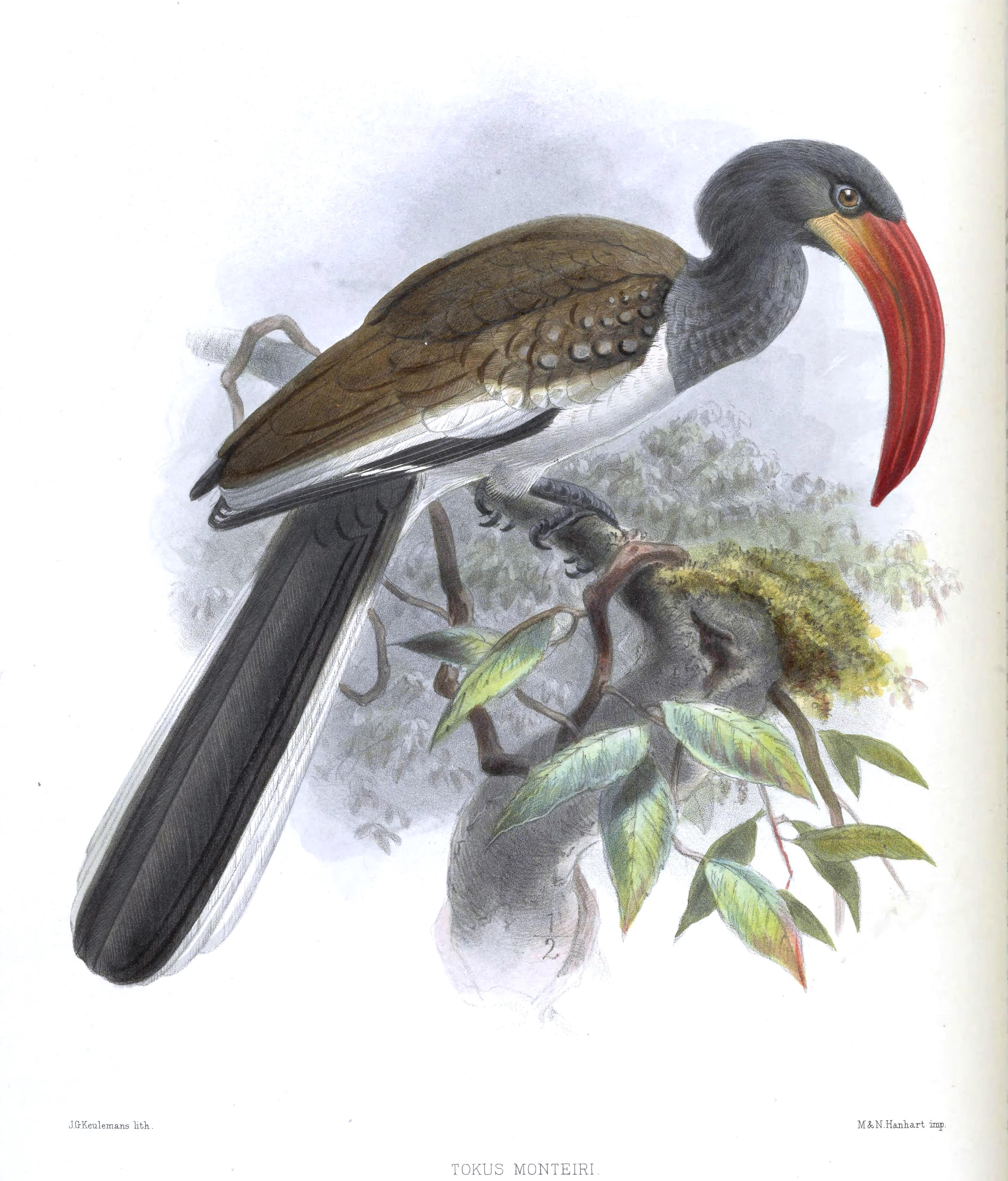
Illustration by Keulemans
