= Christian Érard =

French ornithologist (1939 - 2023)

- Born: 1939
- Died: 2023
- Occupation: Ornithologist

Christian Érard (May 25, 1939 – November, 16, 2023) was a French ecologist and ornithologist.

Érard was born in Hennezel and became interested in the birds of the forests of his native Vosges. From 1956 to 1960, he completed his training at the École Normale Supérieure in Châlons-sur-Marne, during which time he worked at the Center for Research on the Migration of Mammals and Birds (CRMMO) at the National Museum of Natural History. In 1961, he became a professor, obtained the Certificate of Higher Studies in Science in Physics, Chemistry and Natural History (S.P.C.N.) at the University of Reims the same year and performed his military service from 1961 to 1963. He obtained certificates in general botany, plant biology and microbiology, as well as biology in Paris in 1963. The same year he was appointed professor in general secondary schools. In 1964, he became an assistant at the chair of zoology (mammals and birds) at the National Museum of Natural History, attached to the CRMMO. From 1966, he began a long series of trips abroad, which took him to many countries in Africa, the Middle East, Guyana, the United States and Canada. In 1975, he was appointed deputy head of the Department of Zoology (mammals and birds). In 1989, he received his PhD in Natural Sciences from the University of Rennes 1 with a thesis entitled "Socio-ecology of Muscicapinae in the forest regions of northeastern Gabon." In 1990, he was appointed professor. In 1998, he joined the Functioning, Evolution, and Regulatory Systems of Tropical Forest Ecosystems unit at the CNRS. That same year, he became director of the General Laboratory of Ecology at the National Museum of Natural History.

He focused on the study of bird migration and behavior in tropical regions (particularly in forests), plant-animal relationships, and avian systematics (including phylogeny and biogeography), with a particular focus on African and Neotropical passerines.

He described the Western red-billed hornbill (Tockus kempi) along with Bernard Tréca, as well as several sub-species :

- Glaucidium castaneum etchecopari of the African barred owlet
- Mirafra gilletti degodiensis of Gillett's lark
- Mirafra gilletti arorihensis
- Apalis flavida abyssinica of the yellow-breasted apalis
- Curruca lugens griseiventris of the brown parisoma

== Bibliography ==
- Philippe Jaussaud, Édouard-Raoul Brygoo: Du Jardin au Muséum en 516 biographies. Muséum national d’histoire naturelle de Paris, Open editions books, 2019, ISBN 978-2-85653-853-1 (E-Book-Version)
