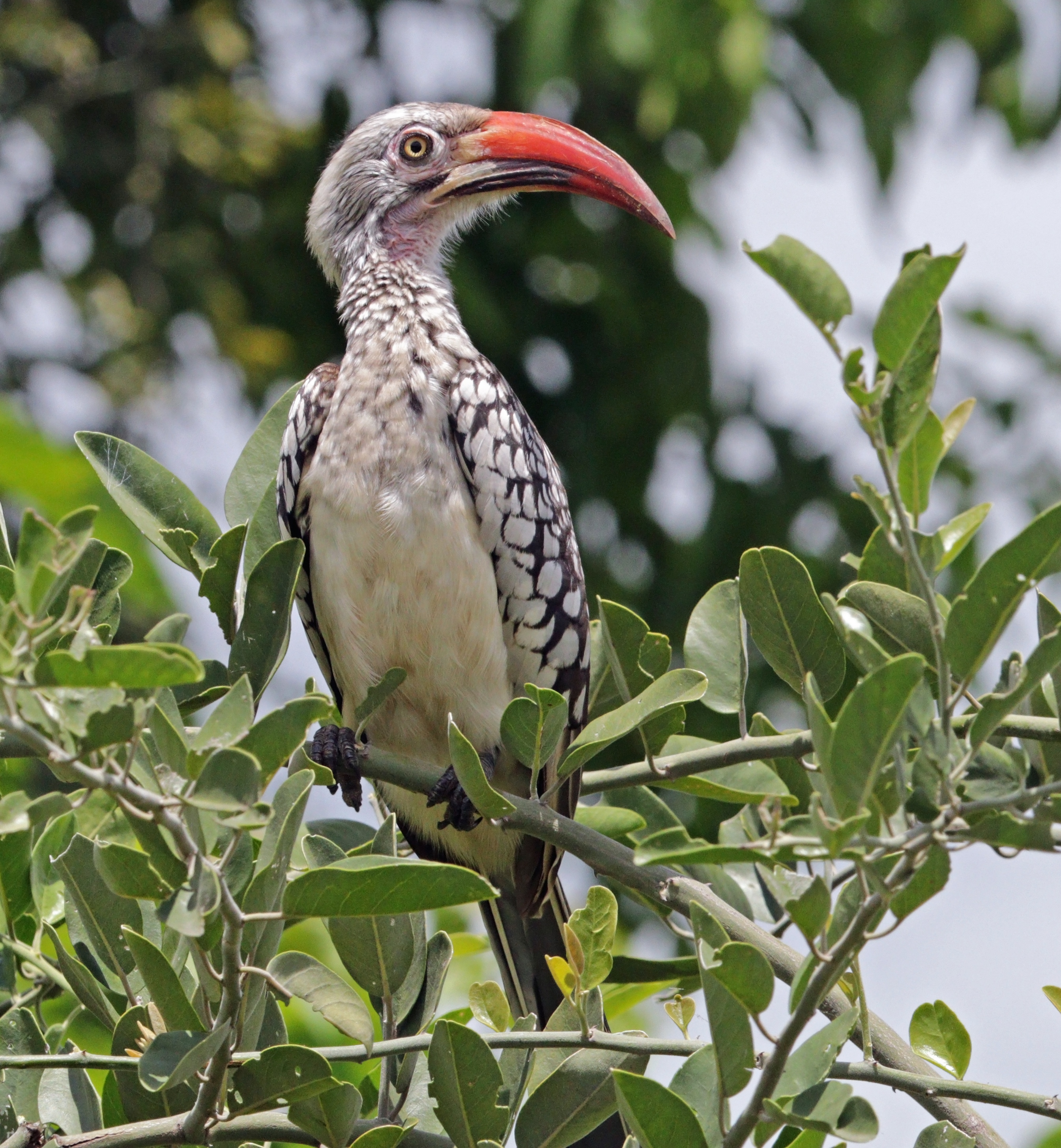
- Male, Chobe National Park, Botswana
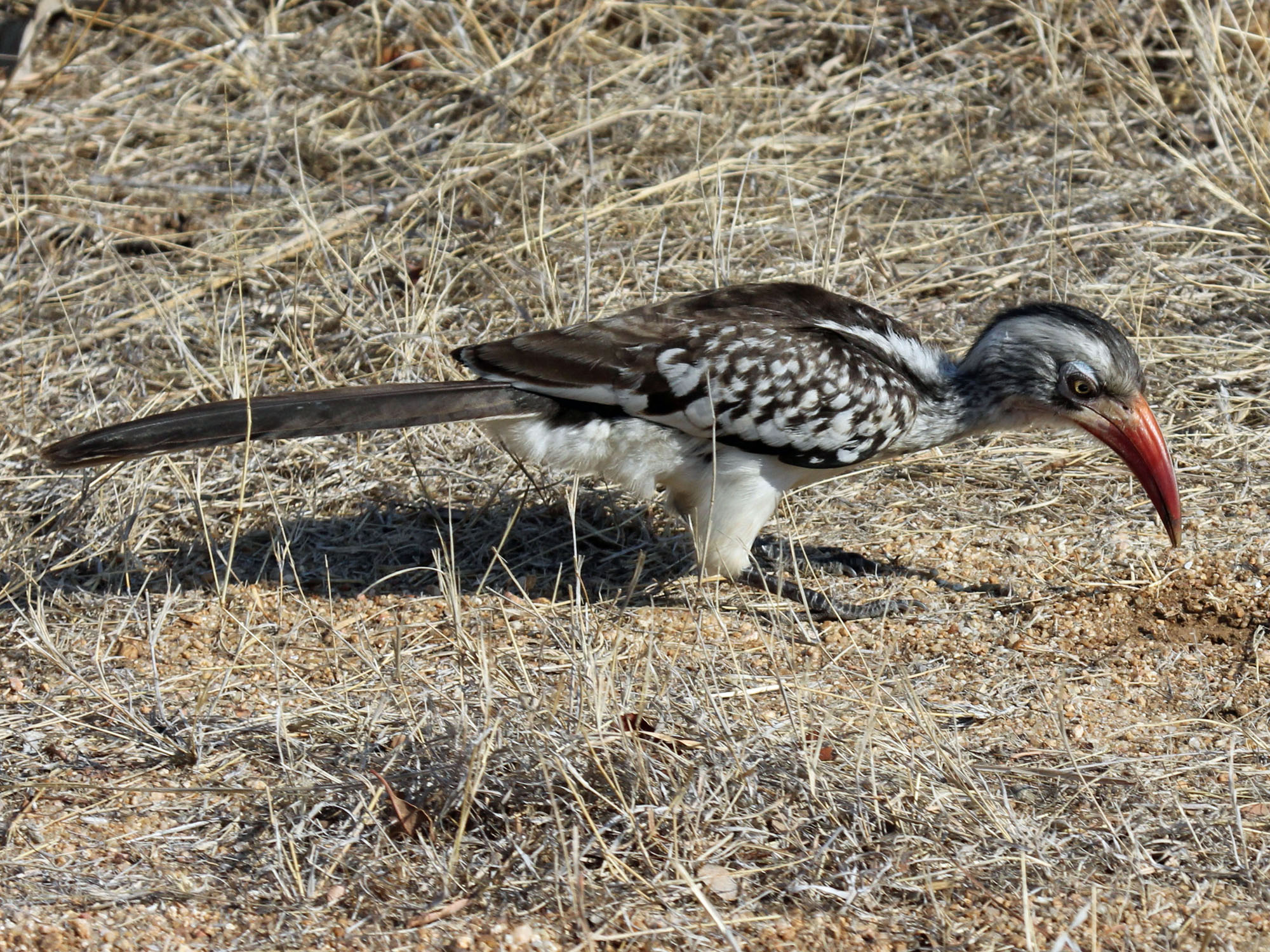
- Female in the Kruger National Park

Scientific classification
- Kingdom: Animalia
- Phylum: Chordata
- Class: Aves
- Order: Bucerotiformes
- Family: Bucerotidae
- Genus: Tockus
- Species complex: Tockus erythrorhynchus complex
- Species: T. rufirostris

Binomial name
- Tockus rufirostris (Sundevall, 1850)

= Southern red-billed hornbill =

Species of bird

The southern red-billed hornbill (Tockus rufirostris) is a species of hornbill in the family Bucerotidae, which is native to the savannas and dryer bushlands of southern Africa. It is replaced by a near-relative, the Damara red-billed hornbill, in the arid woodlands of western Namibia. All five red-billed hornbills were formerly considered conspecific.

== Subspecies ==
It is usually treated as a monotypic taxon, but two additional subspecies have been proposed:

- Tockus rufirostris rufirostris Sundevall, 1850 — bushveld regions of Transvaal, southern Botswana and southern Zimbabwe
- Tockus rufirostris degens Clancey, 1964 — eastern lowveld
- Tockus rufirostris ngamiensis Roberts, 1932 — northern Namibia to northern Zimbabwe

T. r. degens is the smallest in size, while T. r. ngamiensis has browner plumage and a more distinct tail bar. The differences are clinal.

== Description ==
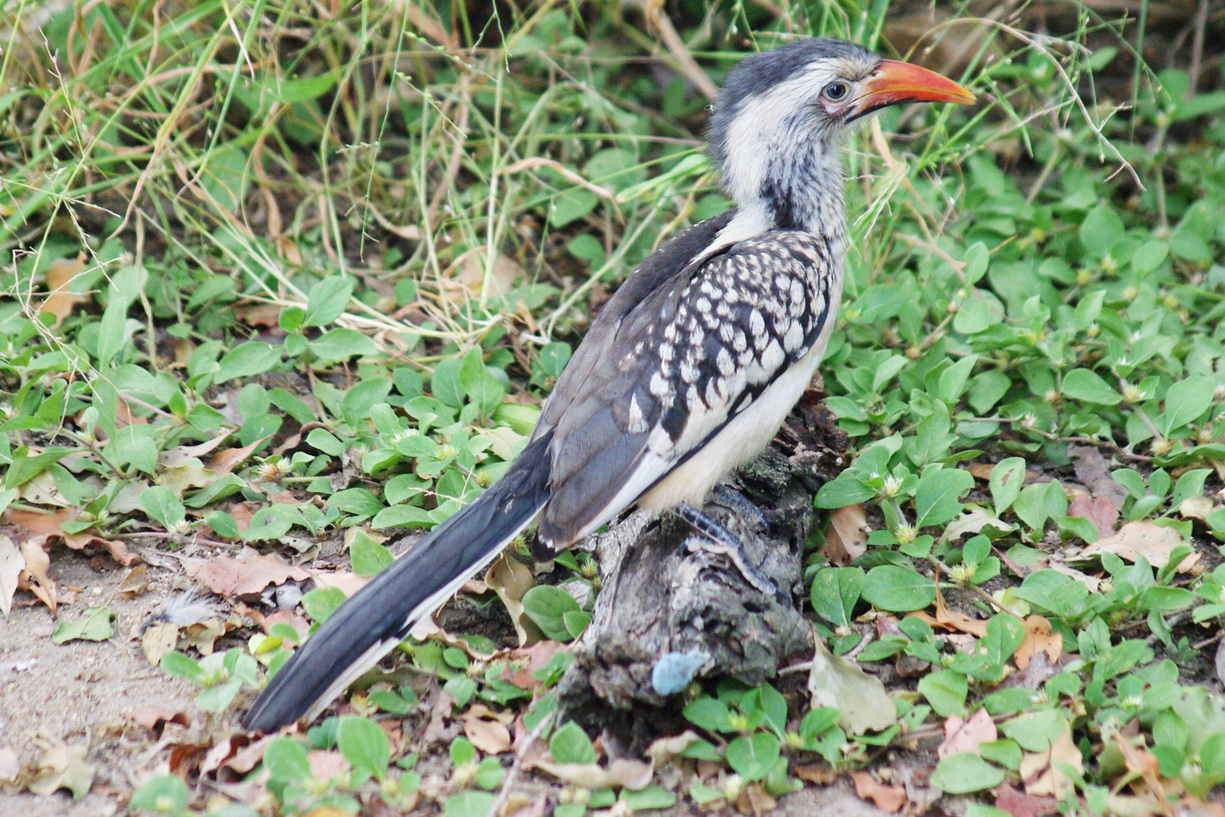
Immature bird – T. r. rufirostris

The sexes are similar, but males are larger and heavier. Males also have somewhat longer bills, with the lower mandible coloured black to a variable extent. It is distinguishable from other red-billed hornbills by the combination of yellow iris and pale orbital skin (pink to greyish), and the ample blackish plumage streaking from the ear coverts to the side of the neck. The throat is white, and the wing coverts clearly spotted.

== Habits ==
The call consists of an accelerating series notes, kuk kuk kuk ... which ends in a crescendo of double notes, kuk-we kuk-we. Unlike other red-billed hornbills, Southern red-billed hornbills do not raise their wings in display.

== Range ==
It is found from Malawi and Zambia to southern Angola, northeastern Namibia, Botswana, Zimbabwe, eastern Eswatini and northern South Africa (Transvaal and northern KZN province). It occurs in the upper Zambezi valley of Mozambique, but is mostly absent from the eastern lowlands.

== Gallery ==
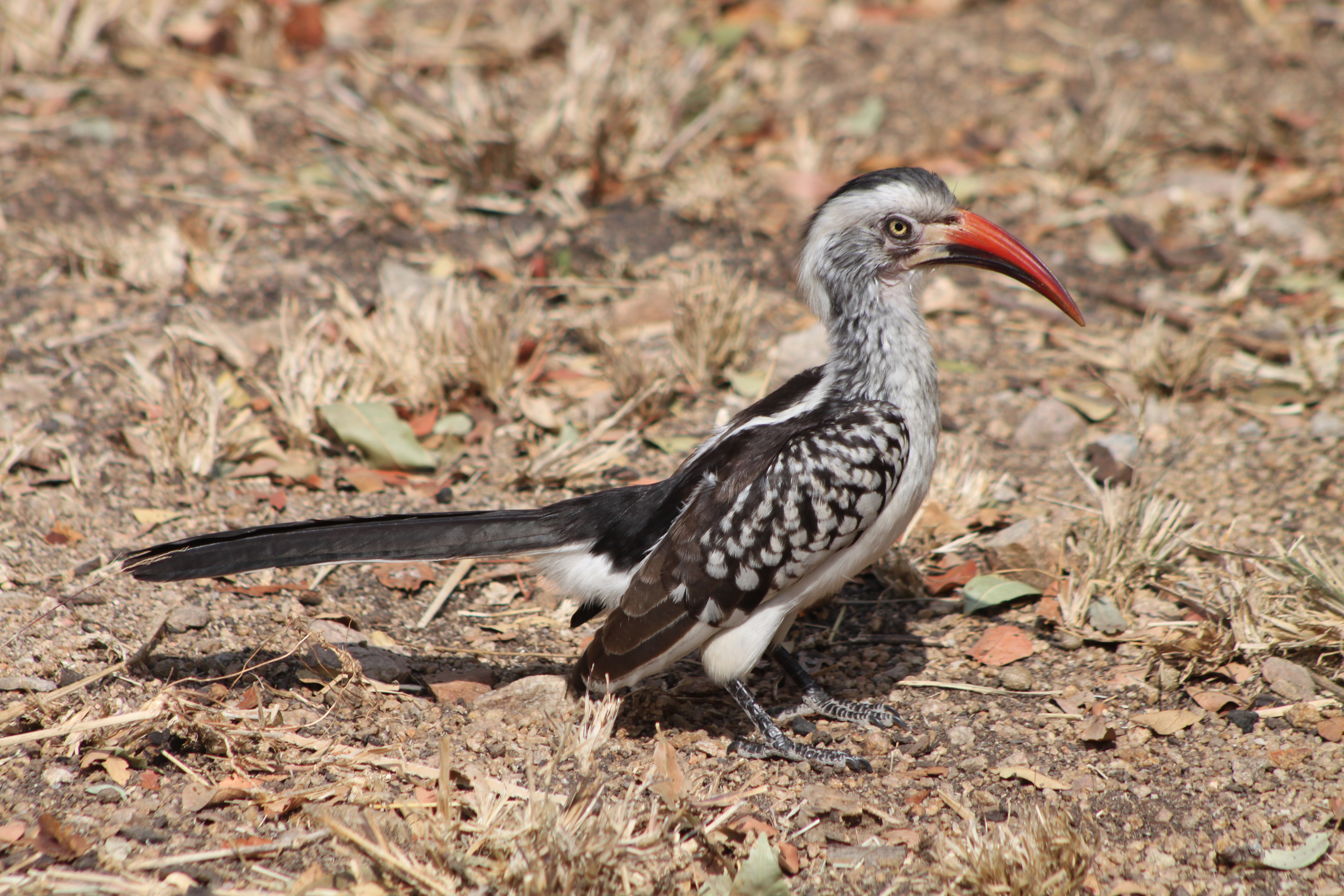
Adult male T. r. rufirostris

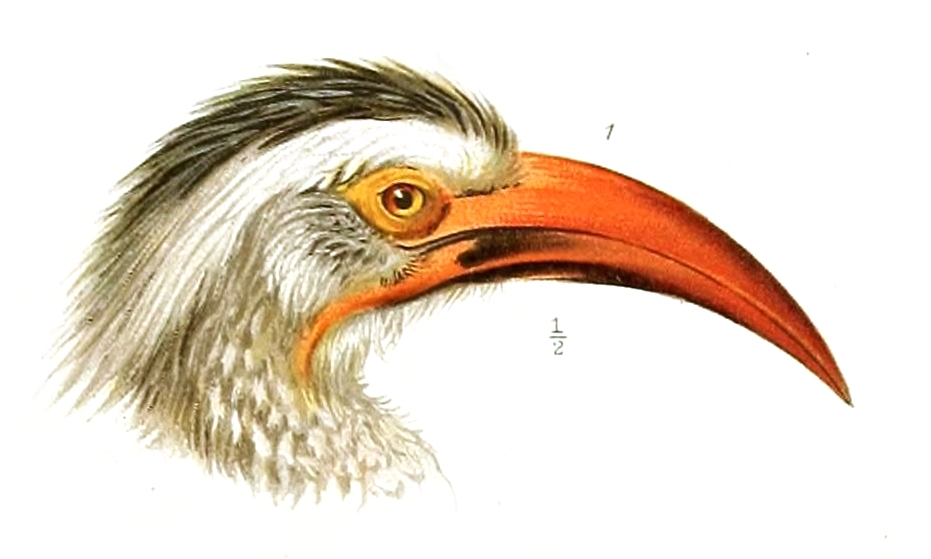
Male head in profile
T. r. rufirostris

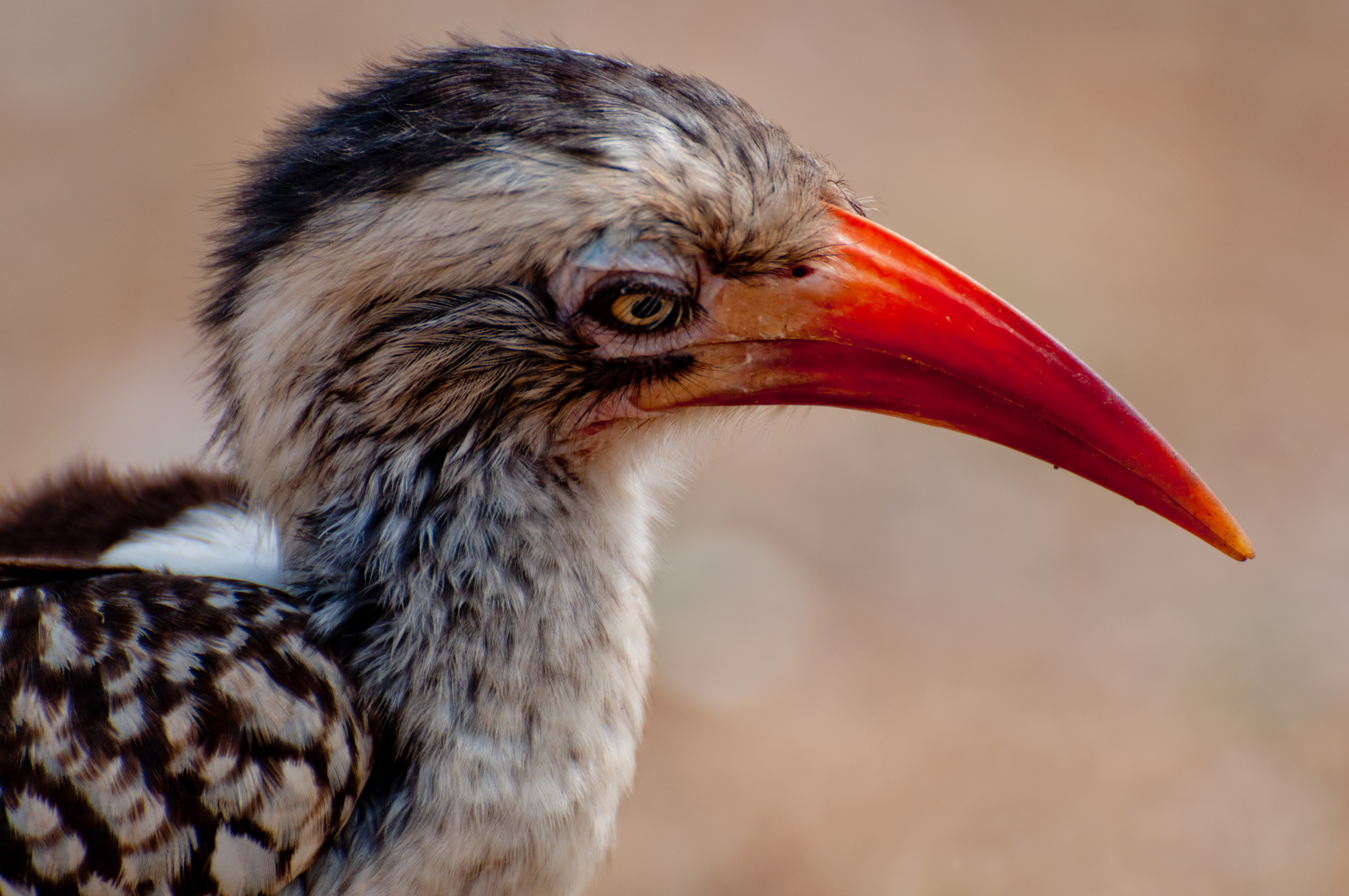
Head of female
T. r. rufirostris

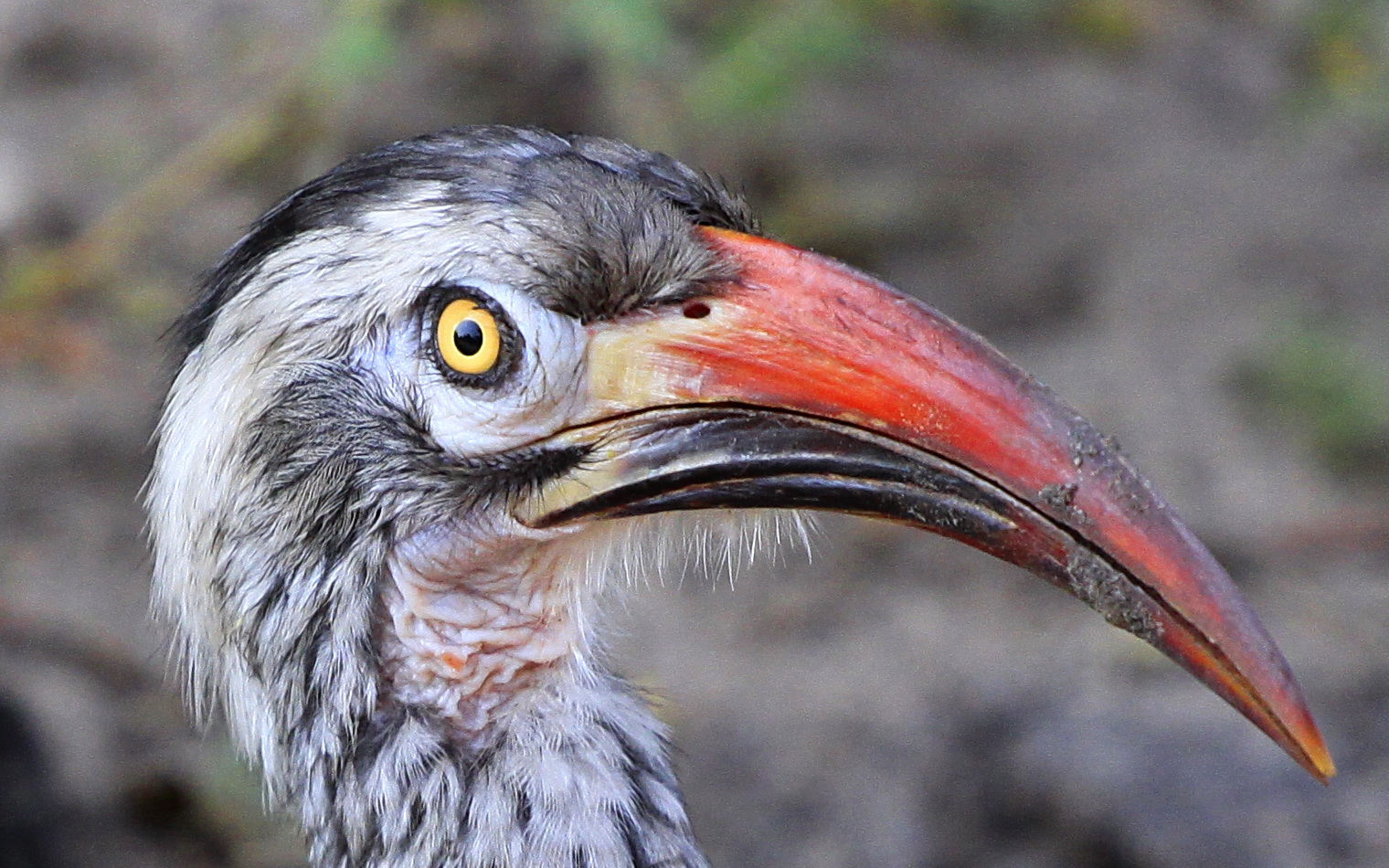
Male head in profile
T. r. ngamiensis
