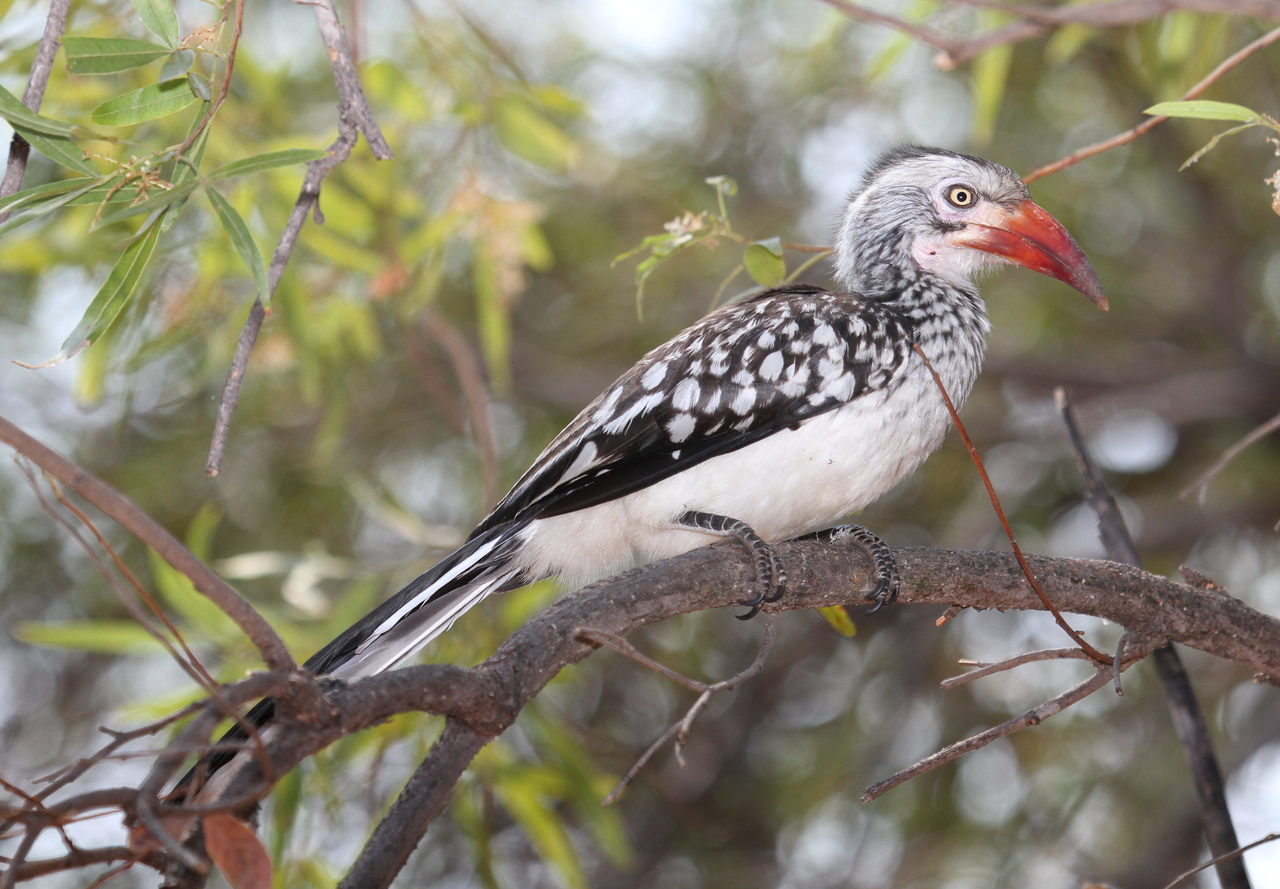
- A female southern red-billed hornbill

Scientific classification
- Kingdom: Animalia
- Phylum: Chordata
- Class: Aves
- Order: Bucerotiformes
- Family: Bucerotidae
- Genus: Tockus; Lesson, 1830

Type species
- Buceros erythrorhynchus Temminck, 1823

Species
- See text

Audio
- Call of a northern red-billed hornbill

= Tockus =

Genus of birds

Tockus is a genus of birds in the hornbill family, Bucerotidae, that are native to Africa.

== Taxonomy ==
The genus Tockus was introduced in 1830 by the French naturalist René Lesson. He listed three species in his new genus but did not specify a type species. In 1840 the English zoologist George Gray selected the type as Buceros erythrorhynchus, the northern red-billed hornbill. The genus name is derived from a word used by local people in Senegal for a hornbill.

== Description ==
Hornbills in the genus Tockus are medium-sized African birds with triangular shaped curved bills. They can be found in tropical and sub-tropical African grasslands, forests and savannahs. They all have long tail feathers which are black on the exterior and white on the interior.

== Species ==
The genus contains the following ten species:

- Tanzanian red-billed hornbill, Tockus ruahae – central Tanzania
- Western red-billed hornbill, Tockus kempi – Senegal and Gambia to south Mauritania and west Mali
- Damara red-billed hornbill, Tockus damarensis – southwest Angola, north Namibia and west Botswana
- Southern red-billed hornbill, Tockus rufirostris – Malawi and Zambia to south Angola and Transvaal
- Northern red-billed hornbill, Tockus erythrorhynchus – south Mauritania through Somalia to northeast Tanzania
- Monteiro's hornbill, Tockus monteiri – southwest Angola to central Namibia
- Von der Decken's hornbill, Tockus deckeni – Ethiopia and Somalia to central Tanzania
- Jackson's hornbill, Tockus jacksoni – south South Sudan, southwest Ethiopia, northeast Uganda and west Kenya
- Southern yellow-billed hornbill, Tockus leucomelas – south
- Eastern yellow-billed hornbill, Tockus flavirostris – Eritrea, Ethiopia and Somalia to north Tanzania
