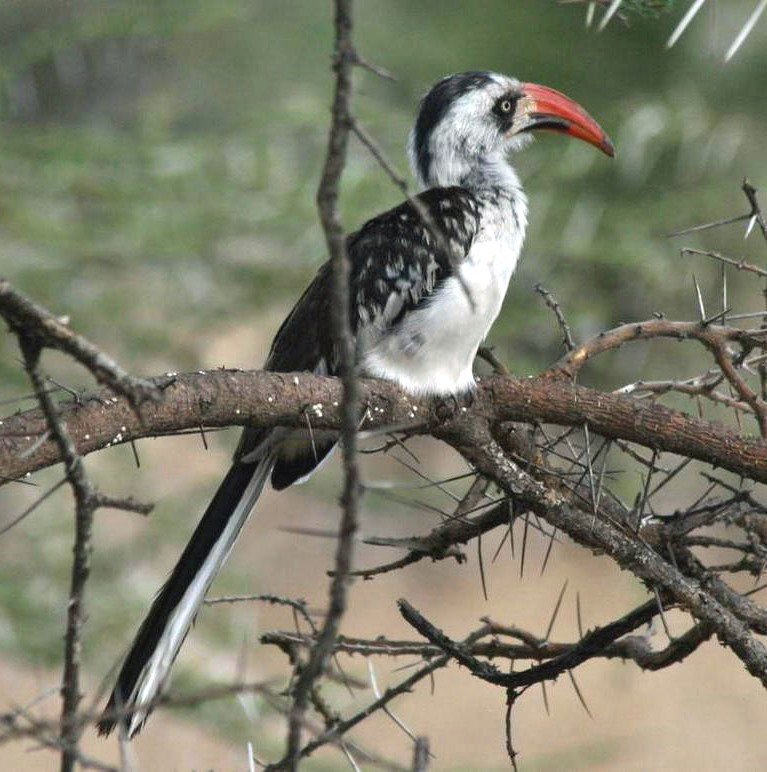
- Adult male in Tanzania

Scientific classification
- Domain: Eukaryota
- Kingdom: Animalia
- Phylum: Chordata
- Class: Aves
- Order: Bucerotiformes
- Family: Bucerotidae
- Genus: Tockus
- Species complex: Tockus erythrorhynchus complex
- Species: T. ruahae

Binomial name
- Tockus ruahae Kemp & Delport, 2002

= Tanzanian red-billed hornbill =

Species of bird

The Tanzanian red-billed hornbill (Tockus ruahae) is a species of hornbill in the family Bucerotidae. It is found in central Tanzania and was discovered by Robert Glen and Sue Stolberger in Ruaha National Park All five red-billed hornbills were formerly considered conspecific.

== Description ==
Tanzanian red-billed hornbills (Tockus ruahae) are small hornbills in the group of the red-billed hornbills. They have curved, bright red bills that end in a small dot of dark orange. Their sclera can vary from light orange to dark yellow and their pupils are usually dark black. Like most species of hornbills, they support medium-sized circles of black skin around their eyes, both in females and males. They have greyish-white necks and bellies and their wings, like all red billed hornbills, have large and small spots of white surrounded by black feathers. Their tail feathers are long and black on the exterior and white on the interior.

== Distribution ==
Tanzanian red-billed hornbills can be found in central Tanzania. They are usually found resting or nesting in trees in forests or savannahs where their food is plentiful.

== Gallery ==
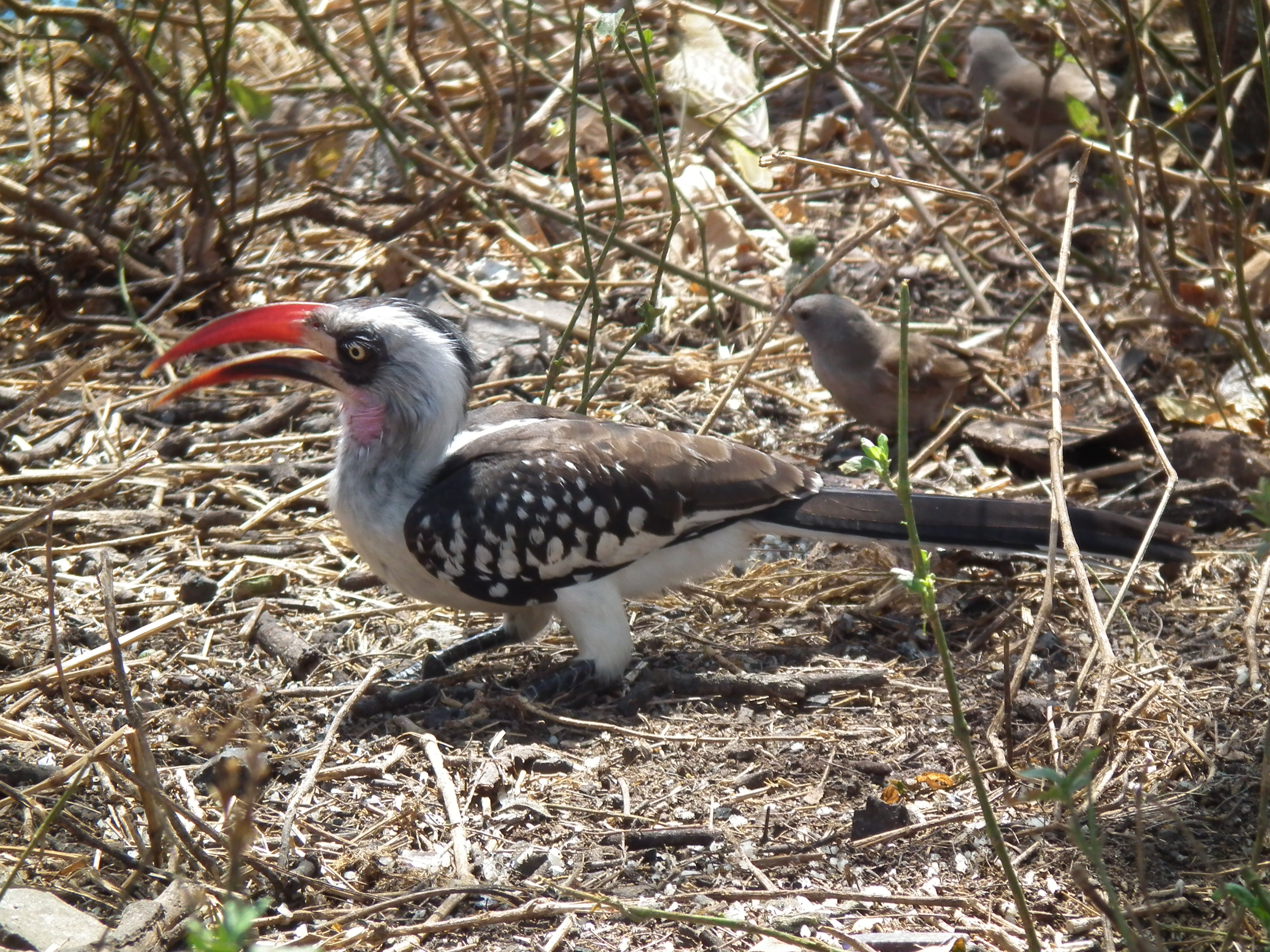
Adult male in Serengeti National Park, Tanzania
