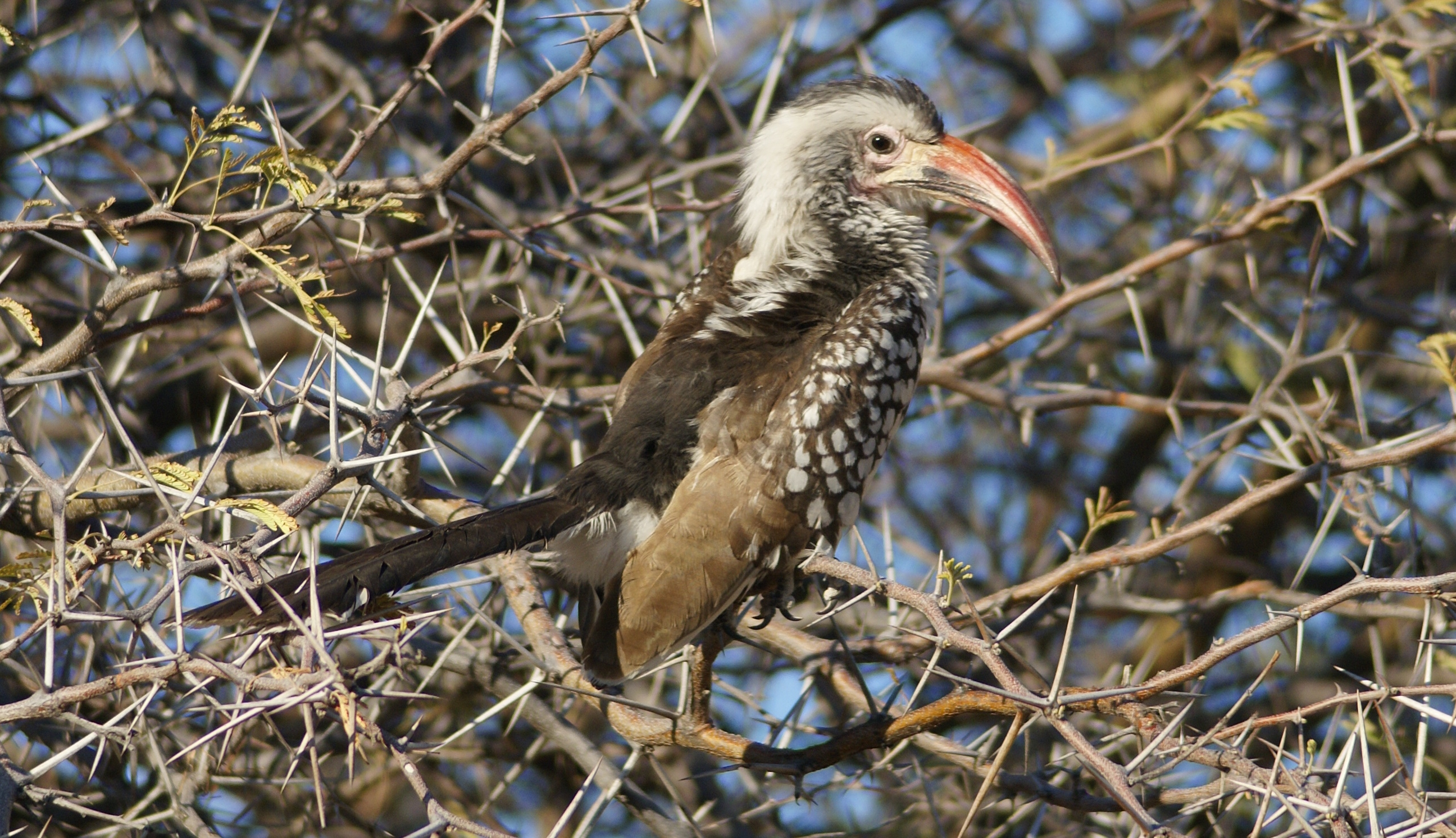

Conservation status
- Least Concern (IUCN 3.1)

Scientific classification
- Kingdom: Animalia
- Phylum: Chordata
- Class: Aves
- Order: Bucerotiformes
- Family: Bucerotidae
- Genus: Tockus
- Species complex: Tockus erythrorhynchus complex
- Species: T. damarensis

Binomial name
- Tockus damarensis (Shelley, 1888)

Audio

= Damara red-billed hornbill =

Species of bird

The Damara red-billed hornbill (Tockus damarensis) is a species of hornbill in the family Bucerotidae. It is found in southwest Angola and northern Namibia. All five red-billed hornbills were formerly considered conspecific.

== Description ==
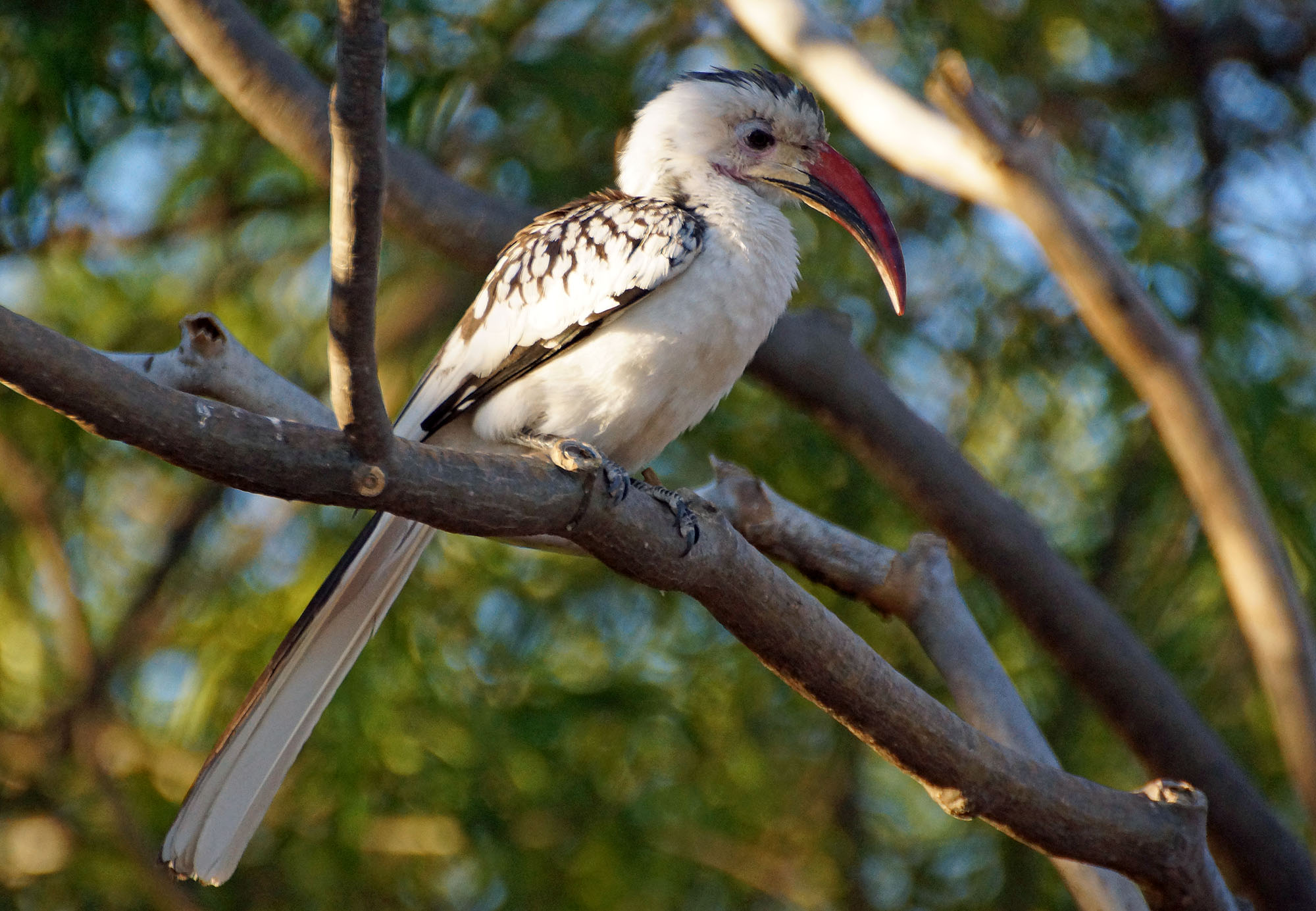
In Kunene Region, Namibia

Damara red-billed hornbills are small species of African hornbills. They have curved dark to bright red bills with their nostrils on the upper beak close to their eyes. Their heads are covered in greyish-white feathers with dark grey feathers running along the back of their heads and upper half of the neck. Like all red-billed hornbills, Damara red-billed hornbills have wings covered in circles of white feathers surrounded by black or dark brown feathers. Their tail feathers are black on the exterior and white on the interior and their legs are short and grey with small semi-sharp claws at the end. Their bellies are usually greyish white but can also be pure white.

== Distribution ==
Damara red-billed hornbills can be found in southwestern Angola and northern Namibia. They can be found nesting or resting in local trees in grasslands or savannahs.
