= Talarak Foundation =

Philippine nature conservation organization

- Type: Environmental
- Founded: 2010
- Headquarters: Negros Occidental, Philippines
- Key people: Fernando Gutierrez (President and founder); Pavel Hospodarsky (Co-founder); Matt Ward (Executive director); Monica Atienza (Veterinarian); Emilio Tan (Administrative officer)
- Website: https://www.talarak.org/

The Talarak Foundation is a Philippine conservation non-governmental organization that operates shelters—Feather Park in Kabankalan, Negros Occidental, and Negros Forest Park in the heart of Bacolod—for endangered West Visayan wildlife. More recently it has also been managing the rewilding within the Bayawan Nature Reserve in Bayawan City, in cooperation with the city government.

The foundation has been at the forefront of the conservation of five key species endemic to West Visayas: the Visayan warty pig, the Negros bleeding-heart dove, and the Visayan wrinkled hornbill, all of which are critically endangered, and the endangered Tarictic hornbill and Visayan spotted deer. "Talarak", along with "dulungan", is a local term for the Visayan wrinkled hornbill, also known as Walden's hornbill.

In 2025, the Philippine government released polymer banknotes featuring protected wildlife in the country, including those on Negros Island under the management of Talarak Foundation.

== History ==
The foundation was established in 2010 in Negros Occidental, starting with a captive conservation center for the endangered and critically endangered Visayan hornbill and Rufous headed hornbill, the Visayan spotted deer, and Visayan warty pigs.

Over the years Talarak grew the center, adding more individuals rescued from injuries and the illegal pet trade, and getting training and expertise from other conservation breeding centers on the island.

=== Negros Forest Park ===
In 2017, the Negros Forest and Ecological Foundation Inc., which was managing the Negros Forest Park, merged with Talarak Foundation.

The forest park, located at the heart of Bacolod City, was established in 1986, with reforestation and the creation of wildlife reserves, the rescue and captive breeding of endangered species, forest community organization, conservation education, and the creation of alternative livelihood and sustainable projects as its aim. In the area of forest community organization and conservation education, it had advocated for the education of farmers, students, communities, and civic organizations on the importance of preserving the forest and protecting the wildlife that lived there.

In 2019, David Castor, curator of the Negros Forest Park Biodiversity Conservation Center, named the breakthrough hatching of a baby Walden's hornbill (named Valentin for having been born on Valentine's Day) as one of the park's highlight events. Valentin was the first hatch of the hornbill couple Kalantiaw and Ligaya after nine years of failing to have an offspring. Castor cited the hornbill as one of the most efficient dispersal units of the forest—after it eats some fruits, it drops them on the ground, facilitating thus the germination of the fruits' seeds.

As of that year the park had around 150 animals, including mammals, reptiles and birds.

=== Expansion of function ===
In 2019, the foundation also concurrently progressed beyond captive breeding and education and started to get involved in wild animal conservation within Negros Island, surveying for the endemic wildlife of Negros within its remaining wild habitats, working with rural communities, and establishing release programs for the captive bred animals.

In 2020, after Talarak surveyed the Bayawan Nature Reserve, the Balinsasayao Twin Lakes Natural Park, and the Ayungon Tayason Municipal forest, Talarak released 32 Visayan spotted deer and 22 Visayan warty pigs into the Bayawan Nature Reserve. By 2023, the number of these animals doubled, bringing up their total to 55 deer and over 60 pigs.

=== Tie-up with Mandai Wildlife Group ===
In September 2021, three breeding pairs of Negros bleeding-heart pigeons were entrusted by the Philippine government, through Negros Occidental's provincial government and the Department of Environment and Natural Resources (DENR), to Mandai Wildlife Group (MWG) based in Jurong Bird Park, Singapore, as part of a groundbreaking captive breeding program.

Three years later, on January 17, 2025, MWG turned over ten Negros bleeding-heart pigeons to Talarak Foundation–Negros Forest Park in Bacolod City two days after they were flown to the Philippines. The DENR also facilitated the repatriation of the doves. The ten birds comprised eight males and two females (1.5 to 2 years old), all offspring of the original three pairs sent to Singapore in 2021. This marked the first-ever repatriation of offspring of the Negros bleeding-heart pigeons to their native country. The three breeding pairs sent to Singapore remained on loan with the MWG.

=== Management of the Bayawan Nature Reserve ===
By 2026 the foundation was deemed a leader in rewilding in the Philippines, notably through its management of the 300-hectare Bayawan Nature Reserve in cooperation with Bayawan's city government. Another long-term aim of Talarak and Bayawan's government is to give full management and ownership of the reserve to capacitated communities by 2035.

The organization also plans to establish a wildlife corridor connecting the Bayawan Nature Reserve and the primary forests of southwest Negros in order to link restored populations with the remaining wild ones.

== Partnerships ==
Aside from its partnership with Mandai Wildlife Reserve, Talarak Foundation also has existing ties with the Toledo Zoo, the Disney Conservation Fund, and Zoo Heidelberg.
