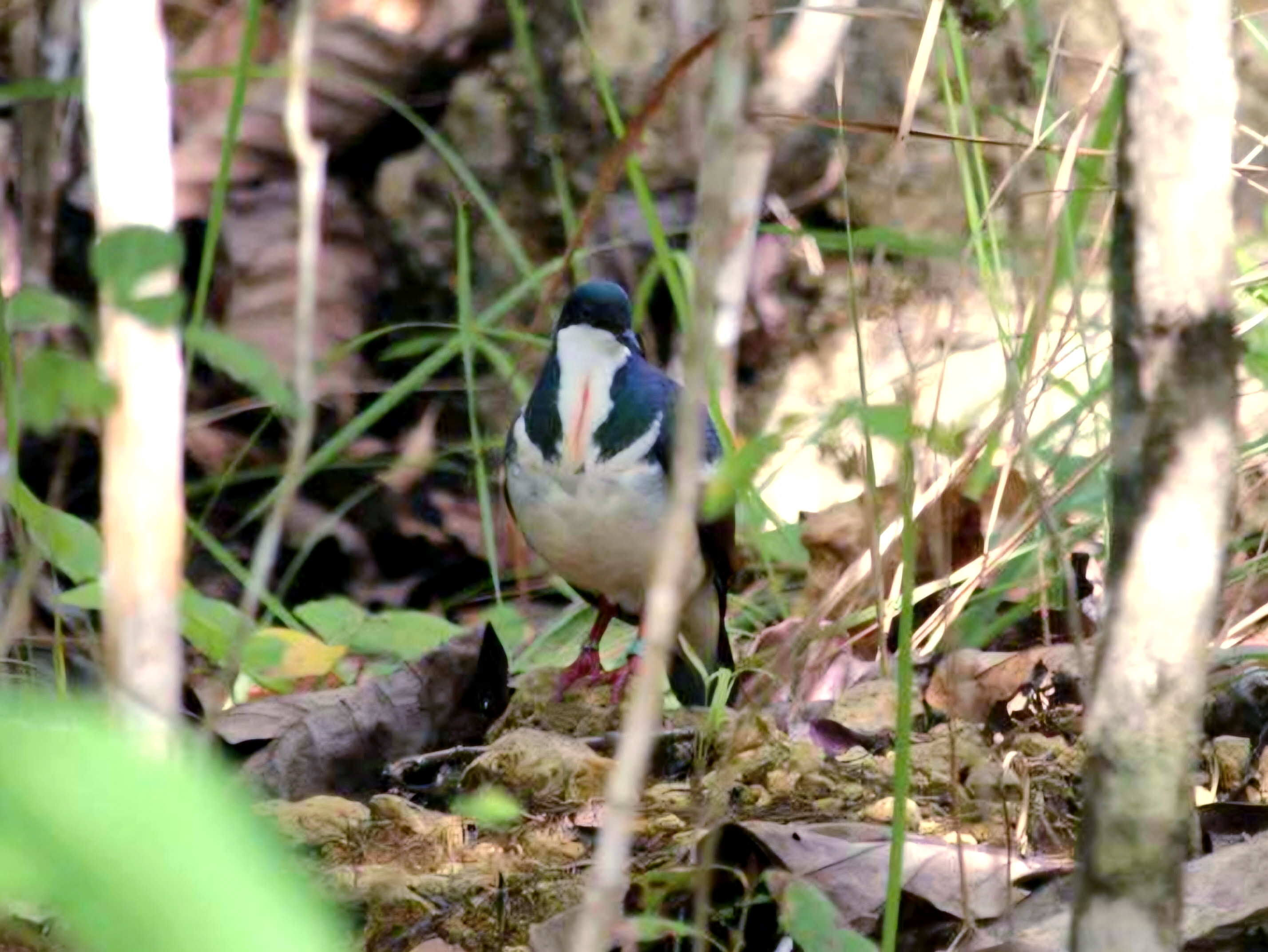
- A reintroduced Negros bleeding-heart in Bayawan Nature Reserve

Conservation status
- Critically Endangered (IUCN 3.1)

Scientific classification
- Kingdom: Animalia
- Phylum: Chordata
- Class: Aves
- Order: Columbiformes
- Family: Columbidae
- Genus: Gallicolumba
- Species: G. keayi

Binomial name
- Gallicolumba keayi (Clarke, 1900)
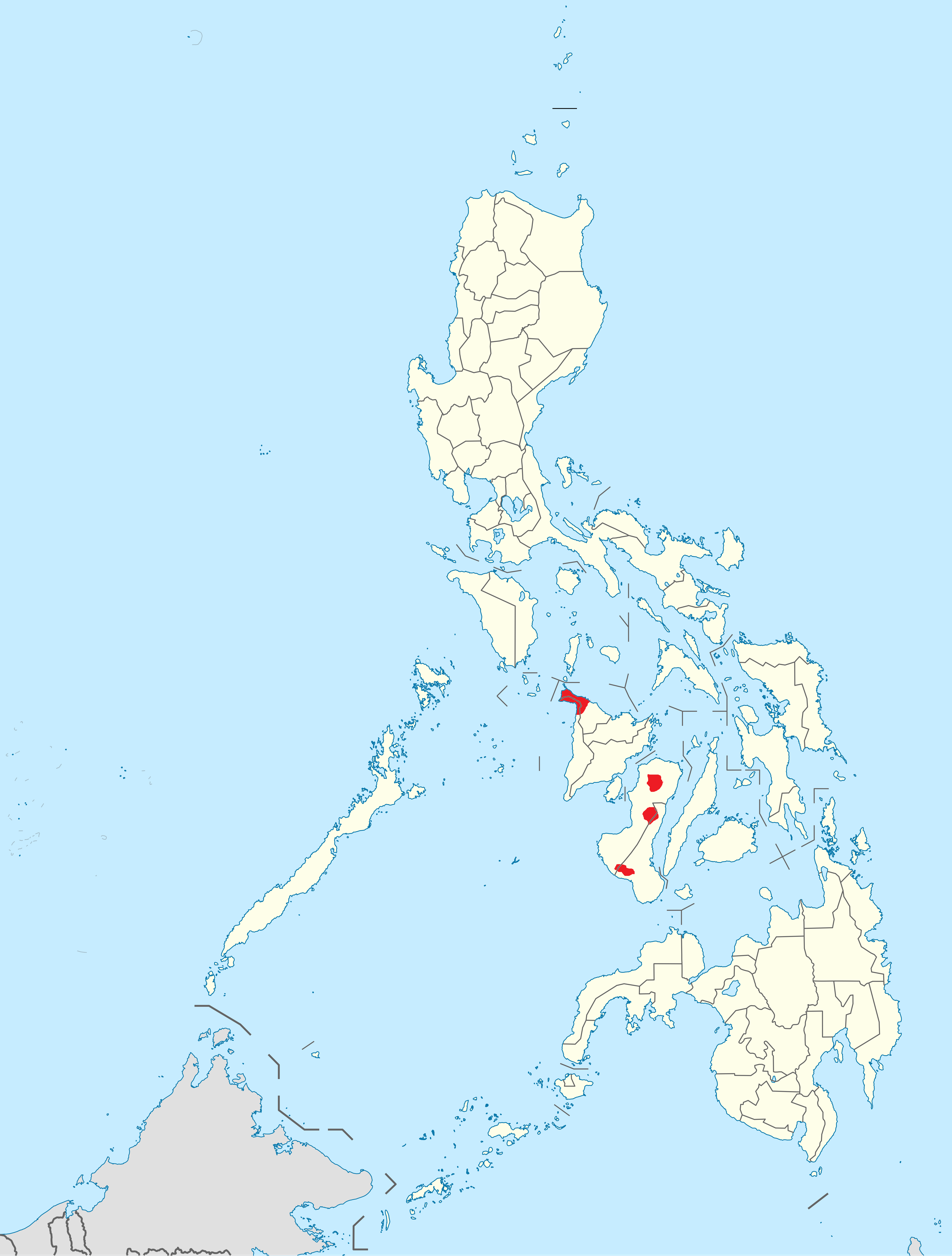

= Negros bleeding-heart pigeon =

Negros bleeding-heart

Species of bird

The Negros bleeding-heart (Gallicolumba keayi) is a species of ground-dwelling dove endemic to the islands of Negros and Panay in the Philippines. Critically endangered, its population is declining due to deforestation and trapping for both bushmeat and the illegal wildlife trade. The population is estimated to be just 50 - 249 mature individuals. The species inhabits tropical moist lowland forests and has an extremely small, severely fragmented population. Among the five species known as bleeding-hearts, this bird is distinguised by its vertical line heart and crescent marks on each wing. The bird is listed as an EDGE species under the analysis of the Zoological Society of London.

It is considered one of the Western Visayas Big 5, which includes the Walden's hornbill, Visayan spotted deer, Visayan hornbill and the Visayan warty pig.

It is illegal to hunt, capture or possess Negros bleeding-hearts under Philippine Law RA 9147.

== Description ==
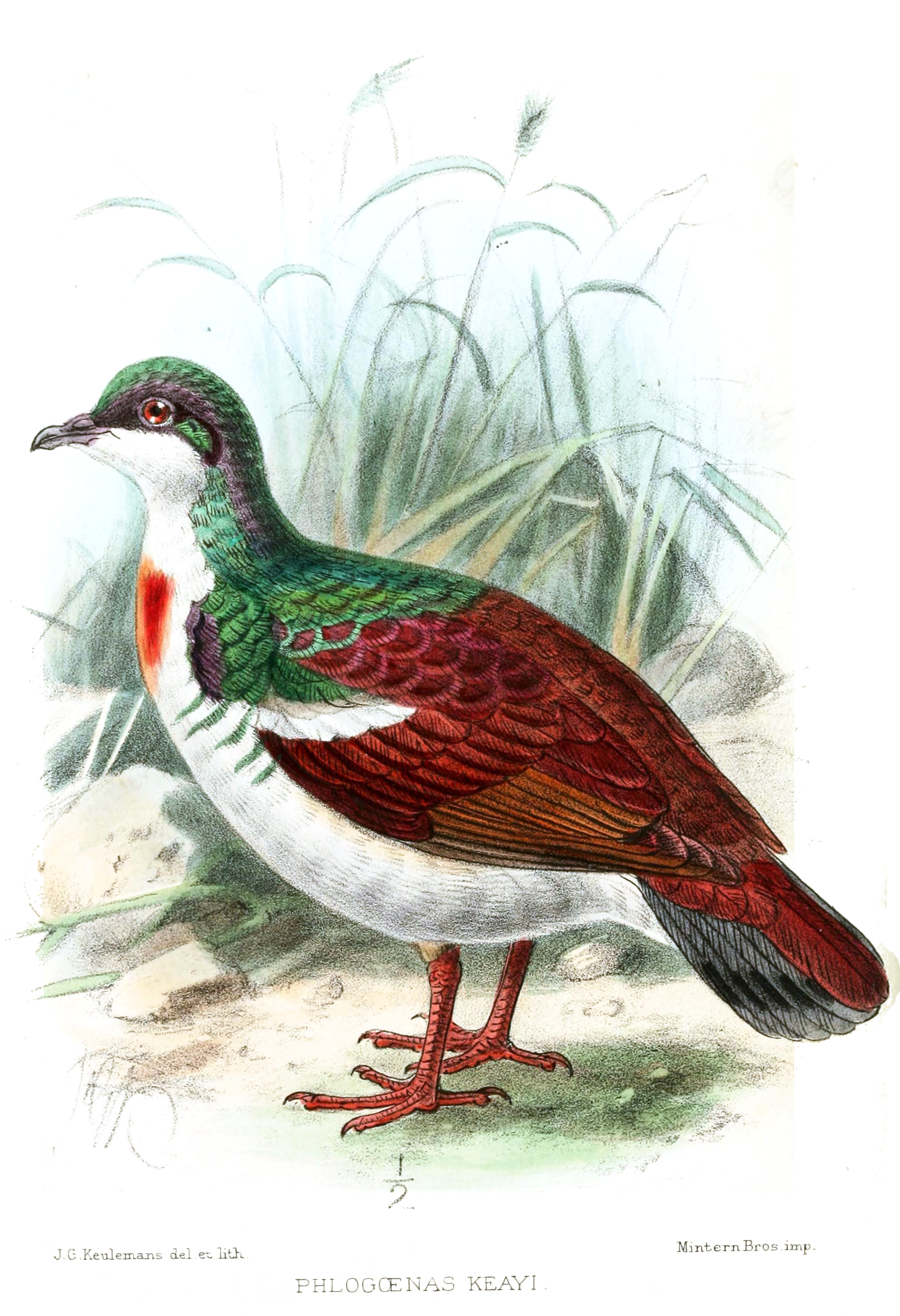
An illustration by John Gerrard Keulemans

Among the other bleeding hearts, this species is distinguished by its long vertical "heart", bright green color, distinguished white "V" shaped wingbar and breast-side bar. This species is monotypic.

== Behaviour and ecology ==
25 cm (10-in) is its total length; individually or in pairs. Ground-feeder but roosts and nests on bushes or vines. The species predominantly feeds on plant material, although there is some potential evidence to suggest that they may also occasionally feed on ground invertebrates.

Birds with enlarged gonads and a fledgling were obtained to study their behaviour. In captivity, the male's heart appears to get brighter and more red during breeding season. It has been recorded nesting in March - June with chicks fledging after only 12 days, apparently as an adaptation to the vulnerability of their open and low nests in epiphytic ferns. Nests appear to be regularly predated.

== Habitat and conservation status ==
The Negros bleeding-heart lives primarily in primary forest up to 1,200 meters (3,900 ft) above sea level. They are sensitive to habitat disturbance and do not tolerate second growth as well but there are some sparse records.

It is critically endangered with the population estimated to be 50–249 mature individuals remaining. They are threatened by hunting for food, trapping for the pet trade and habitat loss . The increasing rate of forest loss on the two islands suggests that the species will continue to decline. By 2007, Negros and Panay had a 3% and 6% remaining forest cover with most of this being higher elevation forest, where the species does not thrive in. Despite already paltry forest cover, deforestation still continues thanks to both legal and illegal logging, conversion into farmland, mining and road development. Trapping and hunting for food constitute other threats.

It was bred for the first time in captivity in 2007 at the Center for Tropical Conservation Studies. The captive population is currently stable, with a number of captive populations in the Philippines such as Silliman University. In 2021, Talarak Foundation sent six birds to Bird Paradise in Singapore to start an ex-situ population with the aim to expand the captive population outside of the Philippines. The successful captive breeding has resulted in the Talarak Foundation releasing captive-bred individuals in the Bayawan Nature Reserve, supported by Bristol Zoo and Toledo Zoo. In September 2021, three breeding pairs were entrusted to Mandai Wildlife Group.

Conservation actions proposed include fieldwork and surveys in areas where they have been reported and other areas with suitable habitats. Provide protection for existing habitats like the Northern Negros Forest reserve. Encourage reforestation activities with an emphasis on native trees. Create education and awareness campaigns to aid in conservation and prevent hunting and the pet trade.

In 2025, the Mandai Wildlife Group sent back 10 individuals to Talarak Foundation, Negros Forest Park in Bacolod managed by the Talarak Foundation. According to EDGE of Existence programme, only 70–400 of the pigeons remain worldwide.
