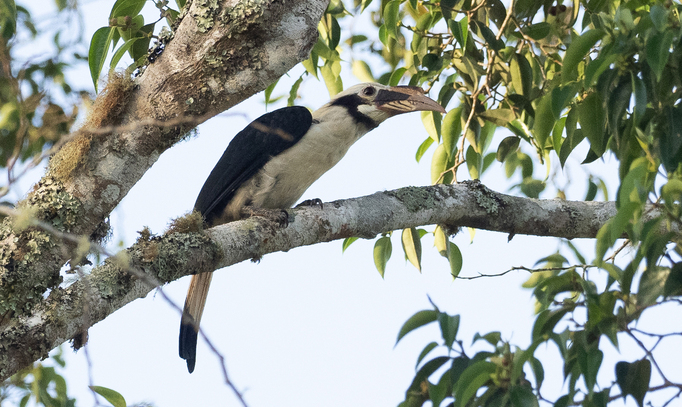
- Male
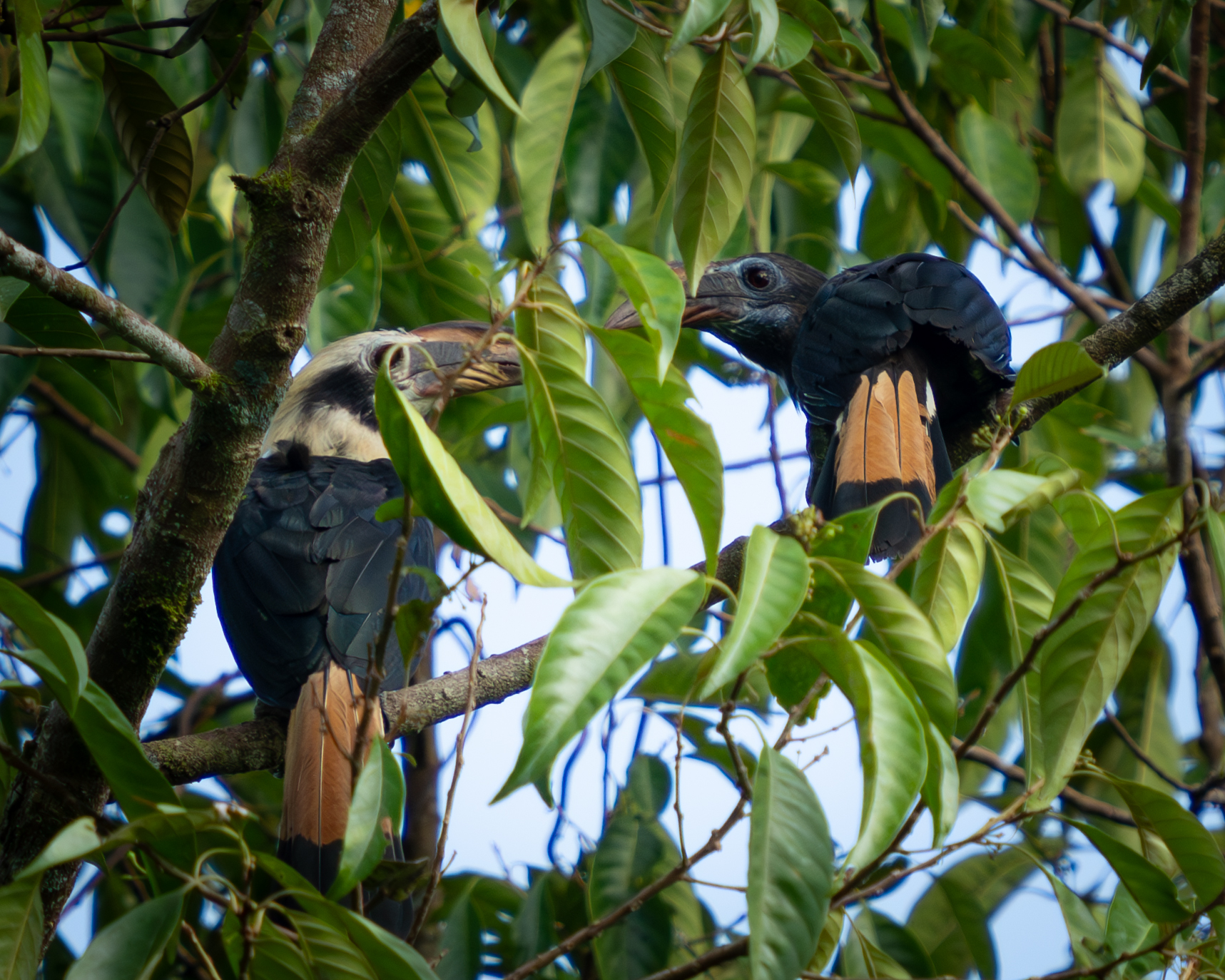
- A male (left) and female (right)

Conservation status
- Least Concern (IUCN 3.1)
- CITES Appendix II

Scientific classification
- Kingdom: Animalia
- Phylum: Chordata
- Class: Aves
- Order: Bucerotiformes
- Family: Bucerotidae
- Genus: Penelopides
- Species: P. affinis

Binomial name
- Penelopides affinis Tweeddale, 1877

Synonyms
- Penelopides panini affinis

= Mindanao hornbill =

Species of bird

The Mindanao hornbill (Penelopides affinis), also known as the Mindanao tarictic hornbill, is a medium-small species of hornbill found in the canopy of rainforests on Mindanao, Dinagat, Siargao and Basilan in the southern Philippines. All five Philippine tarictics were once considered a single species. Its population declining due to habitat destruction, hunting and the illegal wildlife trade.

It is illegal to hunt, capture or possess Mindanao hornbills under Philippine Law RA 9147.

== Description and taxonomy ==
Ebird described it as "A fairly large bird of lowland and foothill forest. Small for a hornbill. Bill fairly short with black bands, and with bare skin around the eyes and chin. Male has pale underparts and head with a black cheek, a pale buffy tail with a black tip, and pale blue facial skin. Female is entirely black with a buffy band through the center of the tail and darker blue facial skin. Rufous hornbill occurs in some of the same areas, but has a red bill. Samar Hornbill's voice is a short, medium-pitched honk, reminiscent of a squeaky toy, often given in rapid series."

Formerly was once a single species. Visayan hornbill, Luzon hornbill, Samar hornbill and Mindoro hornbill. It is most similar to the Samar hornbill which it was again split from although some authorities believe in its treatment as a single species. It is differentiated from the Mindanao hornbill as it is smaller, and the male has a rufous uppertail. Its call is also in a slightly higher frequency. Its diet is presumed to be similar to other hornbills namely fruit, seeds, insects and small mammals and reptiles.

=== Subspecies ===
Two subspecies are recognized:

- P. a. affinis (the nominate subspecies). Found on the islands of Mindanao, Dinagat and Siargao.
- P. a. basilanica. Found on the island of Basilan.

It is social and often seen in pairs or small groups up to 12 birds. These birds are noisy, emitting an incessant ta-rik-tik call, hence the name. Despite their noise they are difficult to find, being well camouflaged by the dense foliage.

== Ecology and behavior ==
They are primarily frugivorous eating figs and berries but they are also known to eat insects, lizards and other small animals. Usually seen in pairs but can form flocks of up to 15 birds.

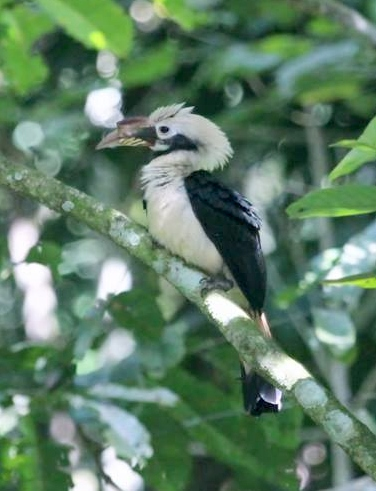
Male

All hornbills are monogamous and mate for life. They are cavity nesters and rely on large dipterocarp trees for breeding. The female seals itself within the tree cavity and the male is in charge of gathering food for its mate and chicks. The male stores food in a gular pouch and regurgitates it to feed its mate and chicks. Cooperative breeding, wherein immature birds from previous seasons help out in feeding the female and chick has not been observed with this species so far. Among Philippine hornbills, it has only been recorded with the Rufous hornbill.

Among the tarictics, this species is one of the least studied but breeding habits believed to be similar to the better studied Luzon and Visayan hornbill. Clutch size is presumed to be 2 to 3 eggs. Incubation period is slightly shorter than the Luzon hornbill at just 25 days. In captivity, chicks fledge within 47 to 54 days.

== Habitat and conservation status ==
Its natural habitats are tropical moist lowland forest with most records under 900 meters above sea level but with records of up to 1,450 meters above sea level.

The species has been assessed by the International Union for Conservation of Nature as a Least-concern species although this still includes the Samar hornbill as part of its assessment. However, Mindanao and Basilan had undergone extensive lowland deforestation on all islands in its range is the main threat. Most remaining lowland forest that is not afforded protection leaving it vulnerable to both legal and Illegal logging, conversion into farmlands through Slash-and-burn and mining. The basilanica sub-species is particularly threatened as there is only 230 hectares of primary forest left. Due to security situation on Basilan, It was only reconfirmed as extant in 2019.

This tarictic species complex is widely kept in captivity, but due to the taxonomic reorganization it is unknown if these birds are of pure descent.

This occurs in a few protected areas such as Mount Apo, Mount Kitanglad, Pasonanca Natural Park, Mount Kalatungan and Mount Malindang but actual protection from illegal logging, hunting, and poaching are lax.
