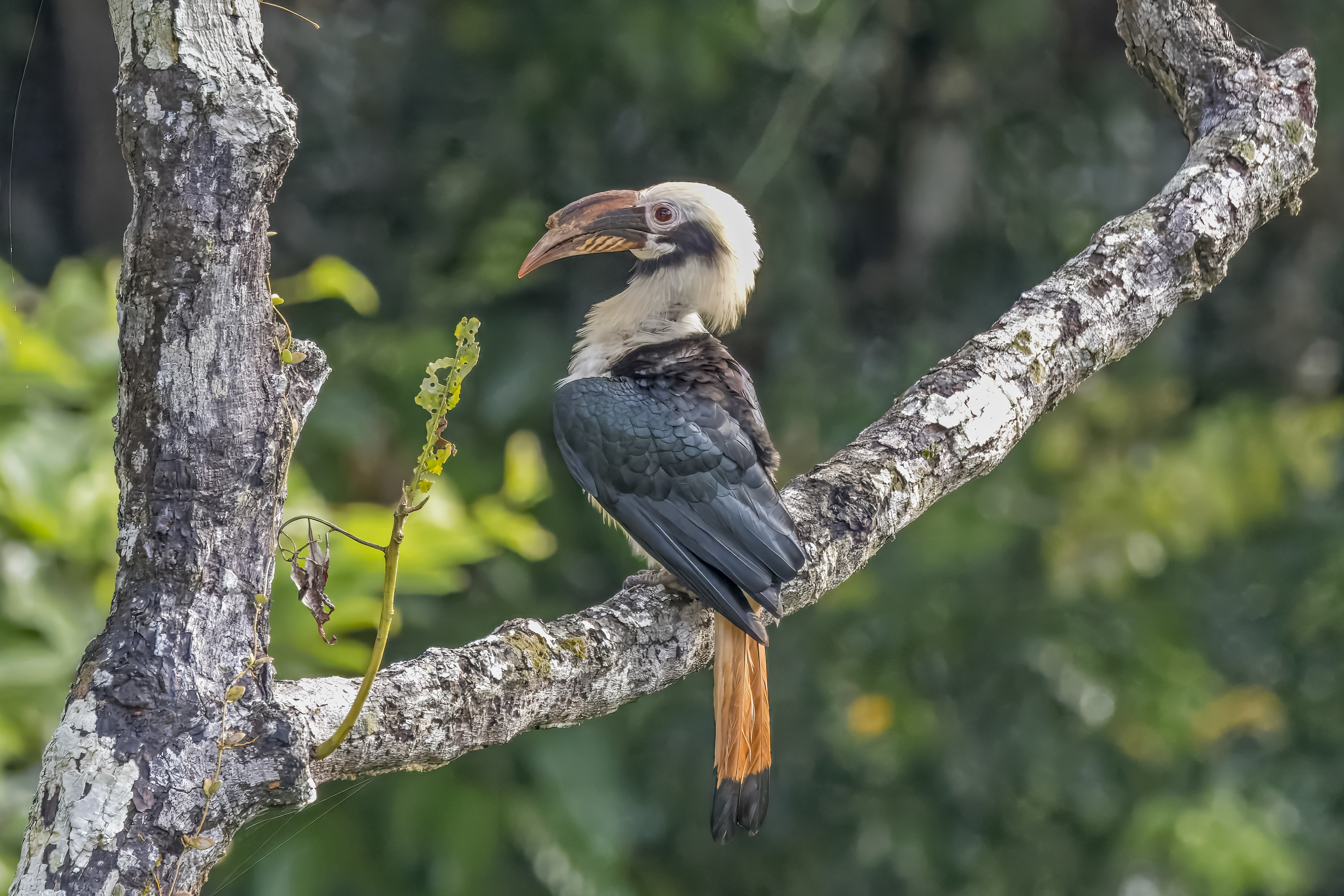
- Male, Bohol
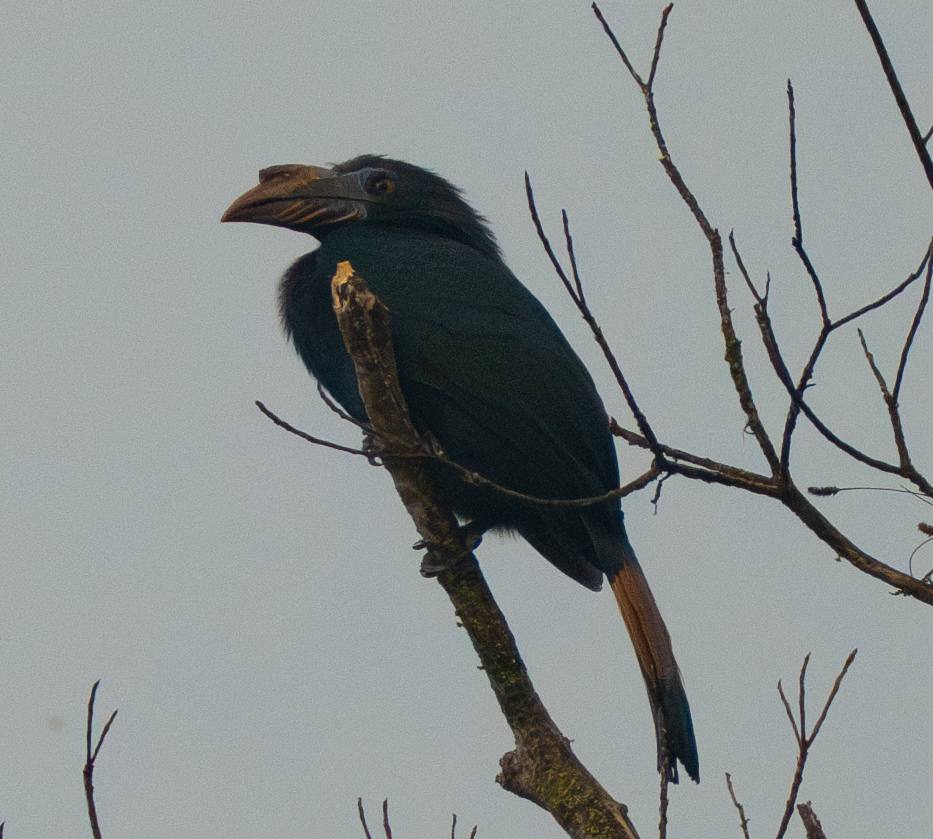
- Female

Conservation status
- CITES Appendix II

Scientific classification
- Kingdom: Animalia
- Phylum: Chordata
- Class: Aves
- Order: Bucerotiformes
- Family: Bucerotidae
- Genus: Penelopides
- Species: P. samarensis

Binomial name
- Penelopides samarensis Steere, 1890

Synonyms
- Penelopides panini samarensis Penelopides affinis samarensis

= Samar hornbill =

Species of bird

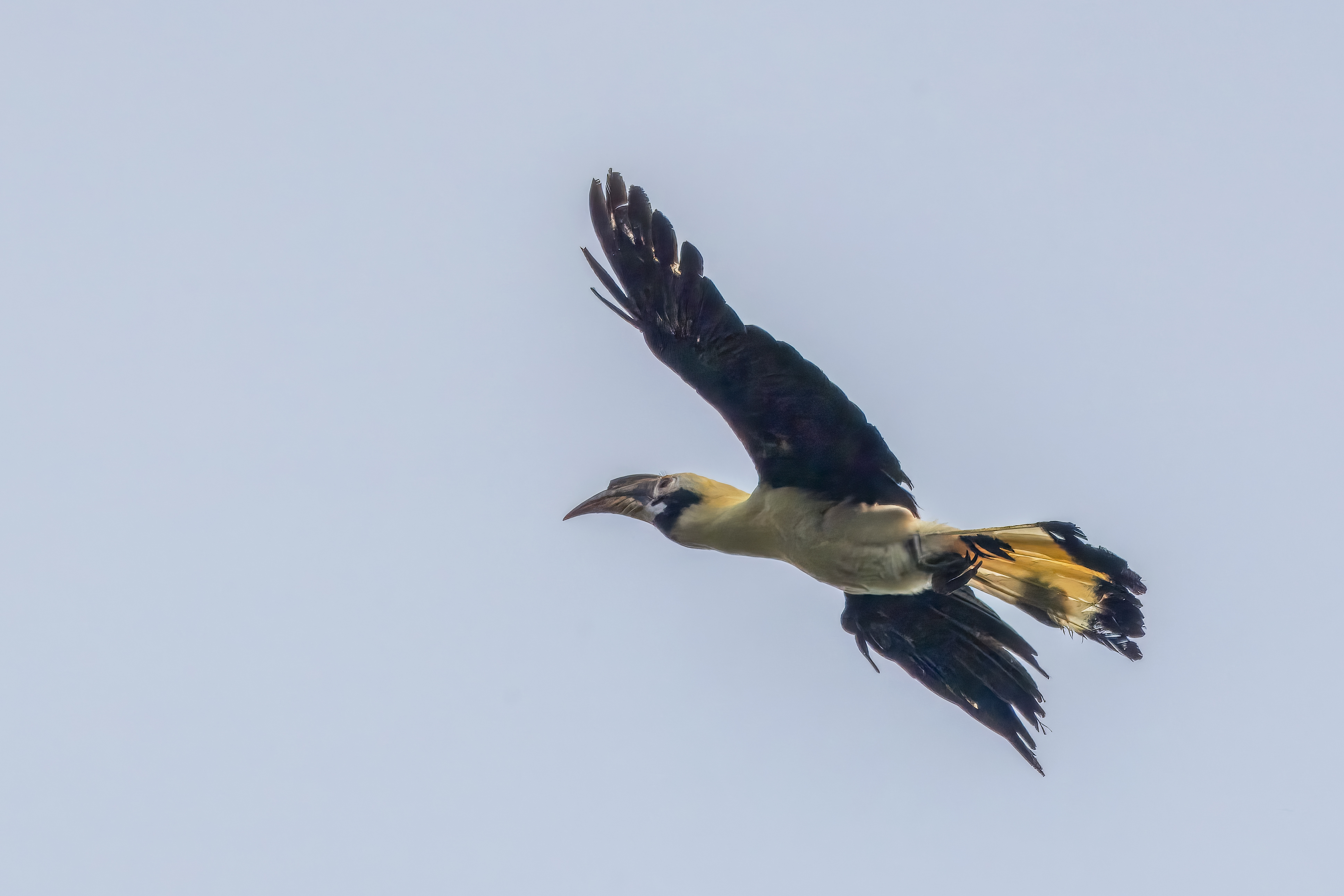
male in Bohol

The Samar hornbill (Penelopides samarensis) is a species of hornbill in the family Bucerotidae. It is found in forests on the islands of Samar, Calicoan, Leyte and Bohol in the east-central Philippines. As is the case with all Philippine tarictic hornbills, it has been considered a subspecies of Visayan hornbill Alternatively, it is considered a subspecies of Mindanao hornbill.

It is illegal to hunt, capture or possess these birds under Philippine Law RA 9147.

== Description and taxonomy ==
Ebird described it as "A fairly large bird of lowland and foothill forest. Small for a hornbill. Bill fairly short with black bands, and with bare skin around the eyes and chin. Male has pale underparts and head with a black cheek, a pale buffy tail with a black tip, and pale blue facial skin. Female is entirely black with a buffy band through the center of the tail and darker blue facial skin. Rufous hornbilloccurs in some of the same areas, but has a red bill. Samar Hornbill's voice is a short, medium-pitched honk, reminiscent of a squeaky toy, often given in rapid series."

Formerly was once a single species. Visayan hornbill, Luzon hornbill, Mindanao hornbill and Mindoro hornbill. It is most similar to the Mindanao hornbill which it was again split from although some authorities believe in its treatment as a subspecies. It is differentiated from the Mindanao hornbill as it is larger and the male has black and not rufous uppertail. Its call is also in a slightly lower frequency.

== Ecology and behavior ==
They are primarily frugivorous eating figs and berries but they are also known to eat insects, lizards and other small animals. Usually seen in pairs but can form flocks of up to 15 birds.

All hornbills are monogamous and mate for life.They are cavity nesters and rely on large dipterocarp trees for breeding. The female seals itself within the tree cavity and the male is in charge of gathering food for its mate and chicks. The male stores food in a gular pouch and regurgitates it to feed its mate and chicks.

Cooperative breeding, wherein immature birds from previous seasons help out in feeding the female and chick has not been observed with this species so far. Among Philippine hornbills, it has only been recorded with the Rufous hornbill.

Among the tarictics, this species is one of the least studied but breeding habits believed to be similar to the better studied Luzon and Visayan hornbill. Clutch size is presumed to be 2 to 3 eggs. Incubation period is slightly shorter than the Luzon hornbill at just 25 days. In captivity, which may also refer to the Mindanao hornbill which it was formerly conspecific with, chicks fledge within 47 to 54 days.

== Habitat and conservation status ==
Its natural habitats are tropical moist lowland forest with most records under 750 meters above sea level.

IUCN still recognizes it as a subspecies of the Mindanao hornbill so there is no specific assessment for this species. However, it has gone extensive lowland deforestation on all islands in its range is the main threat. Most remaining lowland forest that is not afforded protection leaving it vulnerable to both legal and Illegal logging, conversion into farmlands through Slash-and-burn and mining. There is only 4% forest remaining in Bohol and around 400km^{2} of primary forest combined in Samar and Leyte with no respite in deforestation.

This occurs in a few protected areas such as Rajah Sikatuna Protected Landscape and Samar Island Natural Park however protection is lax.
