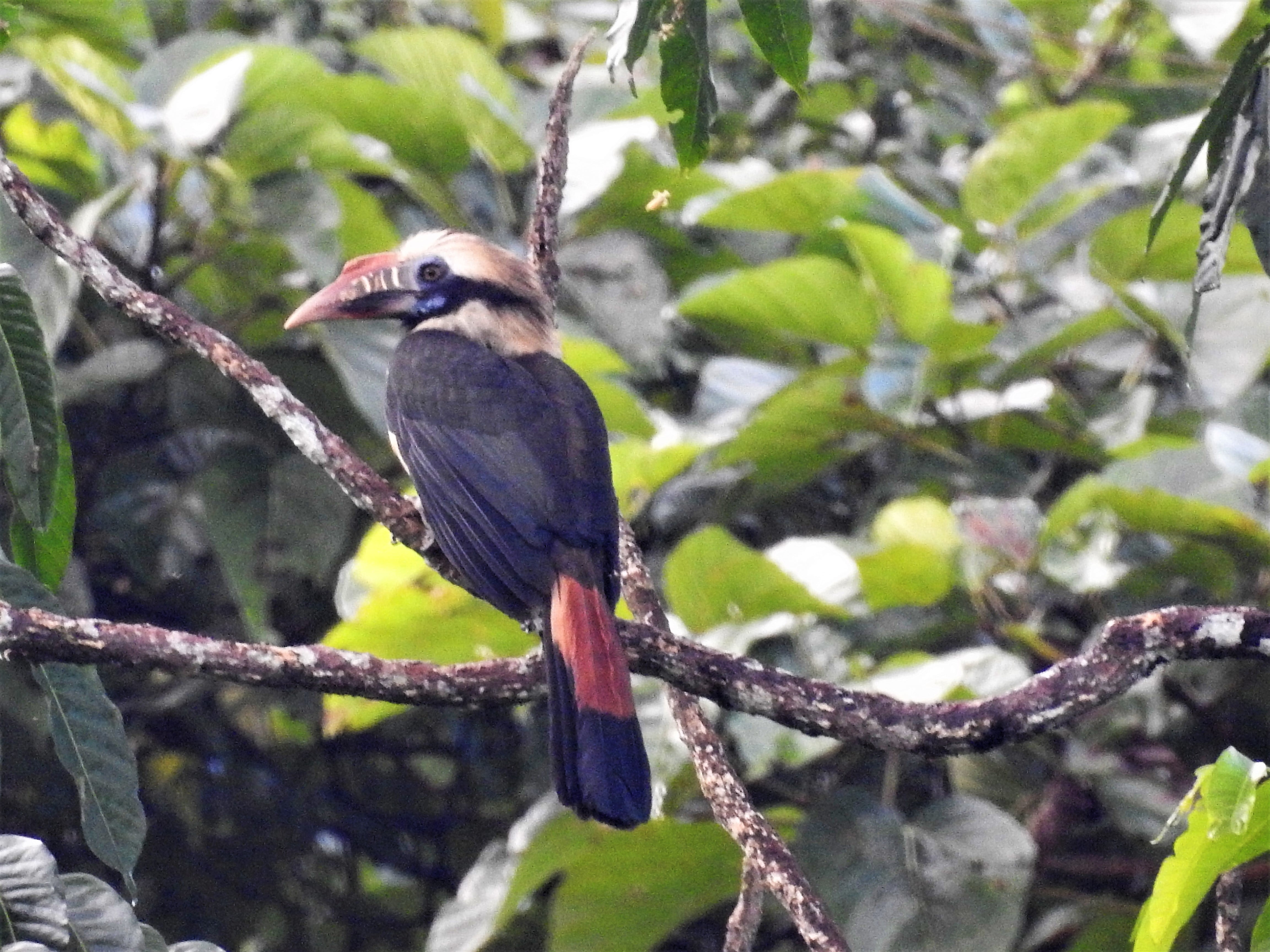
- Female with blue facial skin
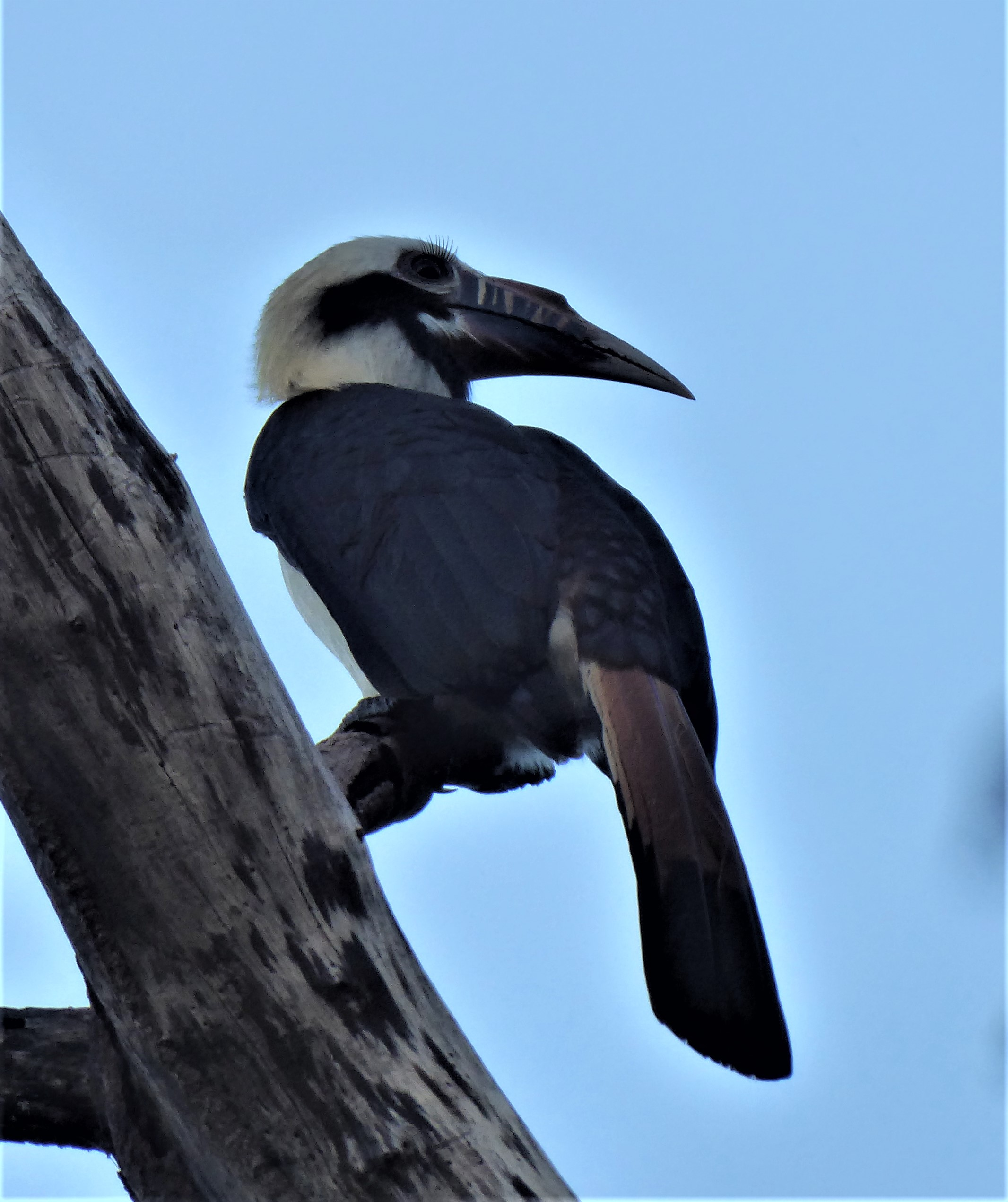
- Male with pink facial skin

Conservation status
- Endangered (IUCN 3.1)
- CITES Appendix II

Scientific classification
- Kingdom: Animalia
- Phylum: Chordata
- Class: Aves
- Order: Bucerotiformes
- Family: Bucerotidae
- Genus: Penelopides
- Species: P. mindorensis

Binomial name
- Penelopides mindorensis Steere, 1890

Synonyms
- Penelopides panini mindorensis

= Mindoro hornbill =

Species of bird

The Mindoro hornbill (Penelopides mindorensis) is a species of hornbill in the family Bucerotidae. It is endemic to forests on Mindoro in the Philippines found in tropical moist lowland forests. As is the case with all five Philippine tarictic hornbills, formerly considered to be just one species. It is the only tarictic hornbill where both sexes are creamy-white and black. The sexes are very similar, differing primarily in the colour of the ocular ring (pinkish-white in the male, blue in the female). It is threatened by habitat loss, and is consequently considered endangered by the IUCN.

It is illegal to hunt, capture or possess these birds under Philippine Law RA 9147.

== Description and taxonomy ==
It was formerly conspecific with all other tarictic hornbills Visayan hornbill, Luzon hornbill, Samar hornbill and Mindanao hornbill. It is unique among them as other tarictics show a great deal of sexual dimorphism in which males have white heads and breasts while females are almost uniformly black. In the case of the Mindoro Hornbill, both males and females have white heads and bellies with the only physical features to distinguish sexes being the facial skin in which the females' are blue with the male's being pink in color.

== Ecology and behavior ==
They are primarily frugivorous eating figs and berries but they are also known to eat insects, lizards and other small animals. Usually seen in pairs but can form flocks of up to 20 birds.

All hornbills are monogamous and mate for life.They are cavity nesters and rely on large dipterocarp trees for breeding. The female seals itself within the tree cavity and the male is in charge of gathering food for its mate and chicks. The male stores food in a gular pouch and regurgitates it to feed its mate and chicks.

Among the tarictics, this species is one of the least studied but breeding habits believed to be similar to the better studied Luzon hornbill. A females Mindoro hornbill has been found in breeding condition with enlarged gonads in May. Based on the Luzon hornbill, clutch size is 3 to 4 eggs, up to 6. Incubation takes 28 to 31 days and fledgeling occurs within 50 to 65 days of hatching.

== Habitat and conservation status ==
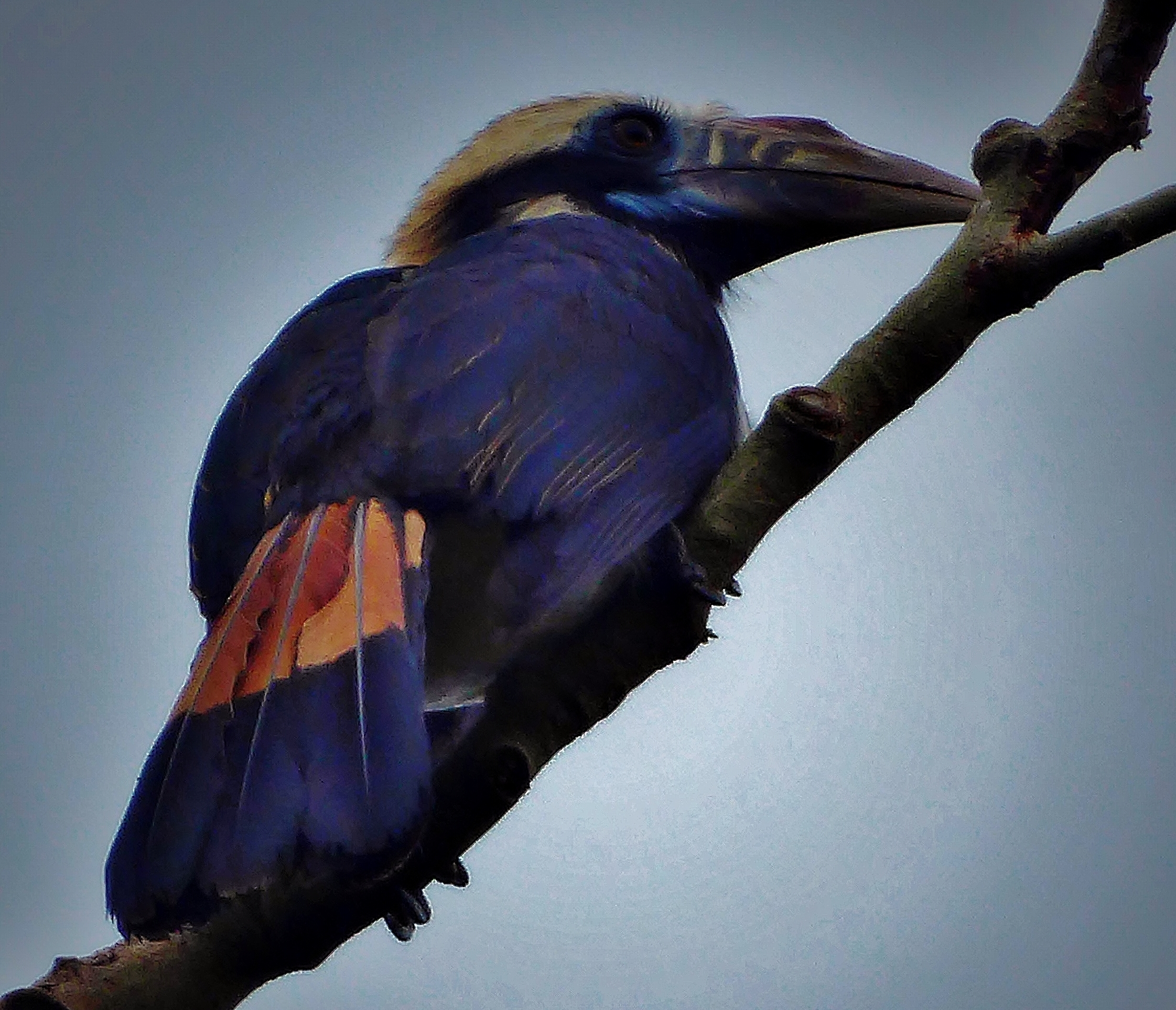
A male observed in Sablayan

It is found mostly in tropical moist primary lowland forest up to 1,000. They are also seen in secondary forest and forest edge but they need the large trees to support their nesting habits.

The IUCN Red List classifies this bird as an endangered species with population estimates of 250 to 999 mature individuals which is the lowest estimate among all five tarictic species. It is threatened by habitat loss with Mindoro having a great loss of forest in recent decades. By 1988, extensive deforestation on Mindoro had reduced forest cover to a mere 120 km^{2}, of which only a small proportion is below this species's upper altitudinal limit. The lowland forest that does remain is highly fragmented and is still under threat. Kaingin or Slash-and-burn cultivation, occasional selective logging and rattan collection threaten the forest fragments that still support the species. Dynamite blasting for marble is an additional threat to forest at Puerto Galera. Hunting and poaching are also considered as significant threats.

It occurs in a few protected areas including Mt. Iglit-Baco National Park, where it shares habitat with the iconic Tamaraw and in Mt. Siburan in Sablayan which has been declared an Important Bird Area.

Conservation actions proposed include more surveys in areas where they have been reported to better understand the population, create formal protection in other sites where they are found in Malpalon, Puerto Galera and Manamlay Lake.
