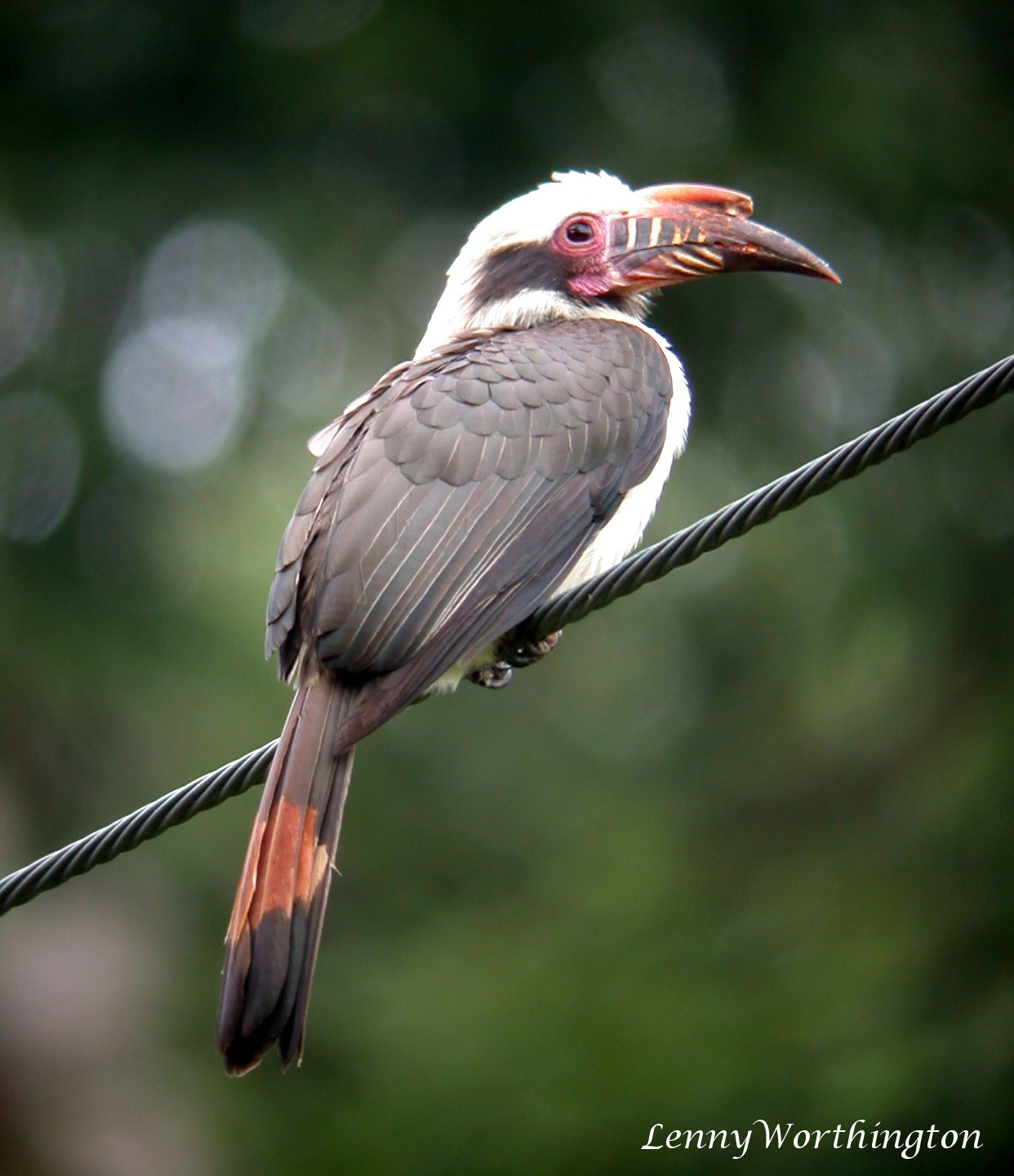
- Male
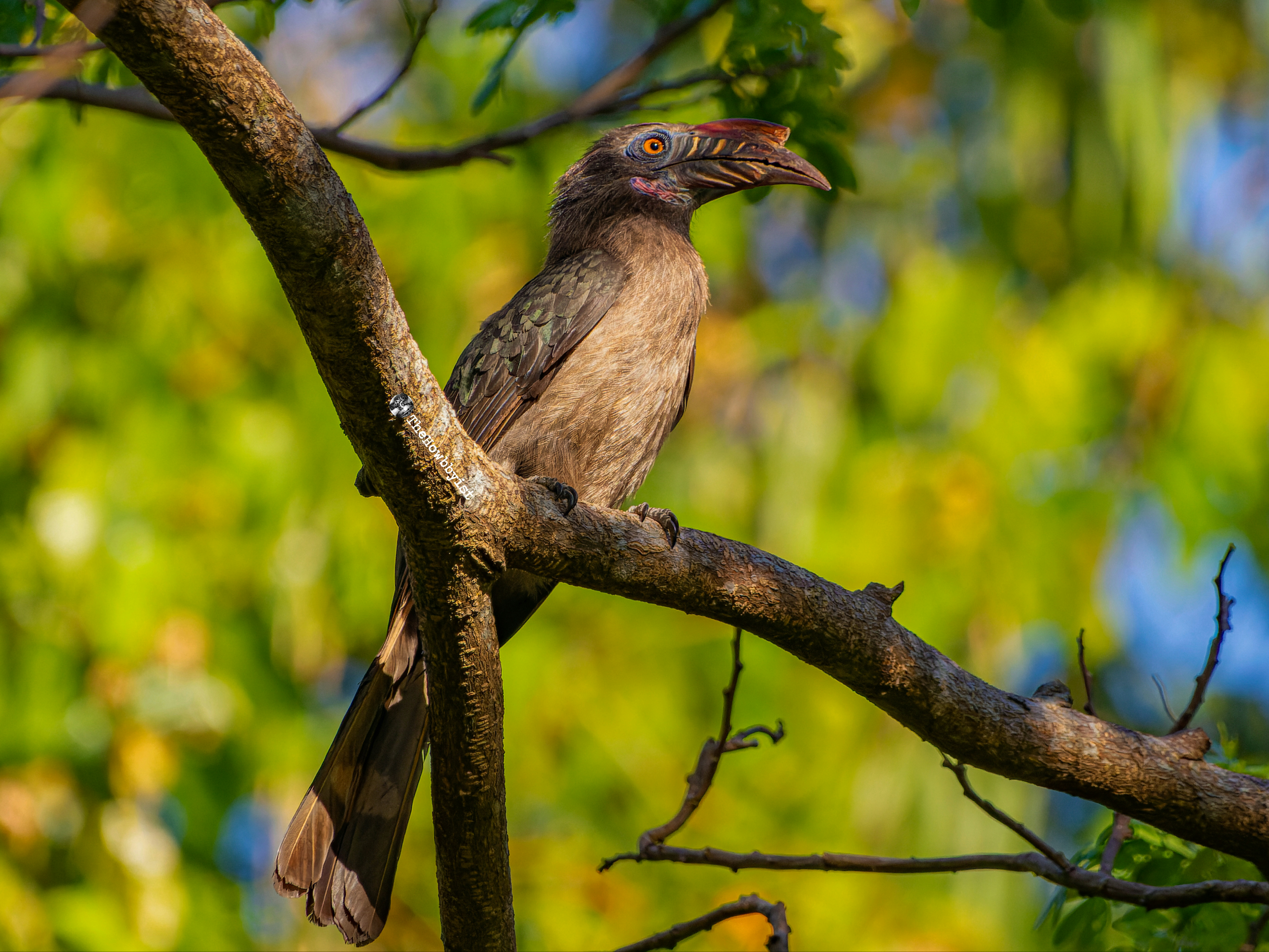
- Female

Conservation status
- Least Concern (IUCN 3.1)
- CITES Appendix II

Scientific classification
- Kingdom: Animalia
- Phylum: Chordata
- Class: Aves
- Order: Bucerotiformes
- Family: Bucerotidae
- Genus: Penelopides
- Species: P. manillae

Binomial name
- Penelopides manillae (Boddaert, 1783)

Synonyms
- Penelopides panini manillae

= Luzon hornbill =

Species of bird

The Luzon hornbill (Penelopides manillae), sometimes called Luzon tarictic hornbill, is a species of hornbill in the family Bucerotidae. It is endemic to forests on Luzon and nearby islands in the northern Philippines. All five Philippine tarictics were once considered a single species. It is declining due to habitat destruction, hunting and the illegal wildlife trade.

It is illegal to hunt, capture or possess these birds under Philippine Law RA 9147.

== Description ==
EBird describes it as "A fairly large bird of lowland and foothill forest on Luzon and neighboring islands. Small for a hornbill. Bill fairly short with black bands. Has black wings and rump, a black tail with a pale band, and bare skin with a blue tinge around the eye and chin. Male has pale underparts and head with a black cheek, while female is entirely black. The only other hornbill in range is Rufous Hornbill, but Luzon lacks the red bill. Voice is a sharp, medium-pitched nasal honk, reminiscent of a squeaky toy."

== Taxonomy ==
The Luzon hornbill was described by the French polymath Georges-Louis Leclerc, Comte de Buffon in 1780 in his Histoire Naturelle des Oiseaux. The bird was also illustrated in a hand-coloured plate engraved by François-Nicolas Martinet in the Planches Enluminées D'Histoire Naturelle which was produced under the supervision of Edme-Louis Daubenton to accompany Buffon's text. Neither the plate caption nor Buffon's description included a scientific name but in 1783 the Dutch naturalist Pieter Boddaert coined the binomial name Buceros manillae in his catalogue of the Planches Enluminées. The type locality is Manila in the Philippines. The Luzon hornbill is now placed in the genus Penelopides that was introduced in 1849 by the German naturalist Ludwig Reichenbach in a plate of the hornbills. The origin of the generic name is uncertain but it may be a combination of the Latin pene meaning "almost" or "nearly", the Ancient Greek lophos meaning "crest" and -oideēs "resembling". The specific epithet manillae is a Latinized form of "Manila".

Formerly was once a single species. Visayan hornbill, Samar hornbill, Mindanao hornbill and Mindoro hornbill. It is differentiated from the others as it has a black tail with a broad white band. Among the tarictics it has the highest sound frequency and rapidness in its calls.

=== Subspecies ===
Two subspecies are recognized:

- P. m.manillae (Boddaert, P, 1783) – Found on Luzon and Catanduanes
- P. m. subniger McGregor, RC, 1910 – Found on the Polillo Islands

The subspecies subniger is larger and has a broader white tailband.

== Ecology and behavior ==
They are primarily frugivorous eating figs and berries but they are also known to eat insects, lizards and other small animals. Usually seen in pairs but can form flocks of up to 15 birds.

In a study on a nest in Zambales, a male hornbill fed 32 different species of fruits and berries. As many as 257 fruits were fed by the male in a single day from this study.

All hornbills are monogamous and mate for life.They are cavity nesters and rely on large dipterocarp trees for breeding. The female seals itself within the tree cavity, 10 to 30 meters from the ground and the male is in charge of gathering food for its mate and chicks. The male stores food in a gular pouch and regurgitates it to feed its mate and chicks. It was previously thought based on other hornbills that immature birds from previous seasons are also known to help out in feeding the female and chick but in the few studies so far on this species, this has yet to be observed. Beetle shells and whole snail shells were observed in the nest and it is believed that the shells serve as a "toy" as also observed in other species such as the Oriental pied hornbill and the Rhinoceros hornbill.

Lays eggs in March to April. Clutch size is typically 3 to 4 eggs but can reach up to 6. Incubation takes 28 to 31 days and fledgeling occurs within 50 to 65 days of hatching.

== Habitat and conservation status ==
Its natural habitat is tropical moist lowland forest up to 900m. The IUCN Redlist has classified this species as least-concern species but the population is believed to be declining. Its threats are mainly habitat loss due to deforestation for lumber, mining and farmlands. It is also often traded for the illegal pet trade. Due to this, the Philippine Red List has assessed this as vulnerable under their criteria.

There are no known targeted conservation actions for this bird, but it will indirectly benefit from the conservation of other North Luzon species like the Critically Endangered Isabela oriole. The stronghold of the Isabela oriole in Baggao is being proposed as a protected area.

This bird is widely kept in captivity but due to the taxonomic reorganization of the tarictic hornbill species complex it is unknown if these birds are of pure descent.

It occurs in protected areas such as Northern Sierra Madre Natural Park, Mount Makiling, Quezon Protected Landscape, Bataan National Park, Bicol Natural Park and Aurora Memorial National Park but actual protection from illegal hunting and logging is lax.

== Gallery ==
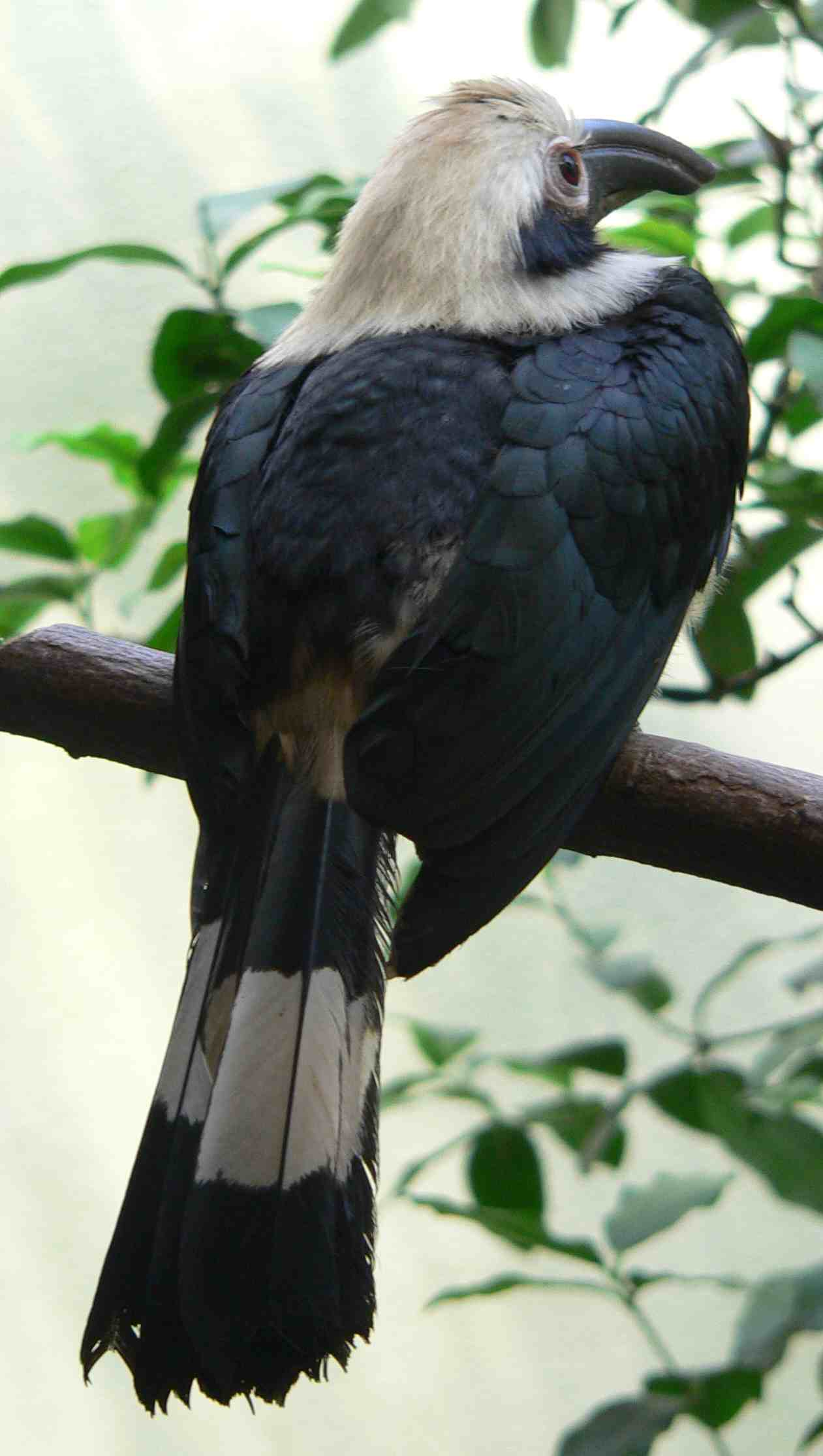
Male

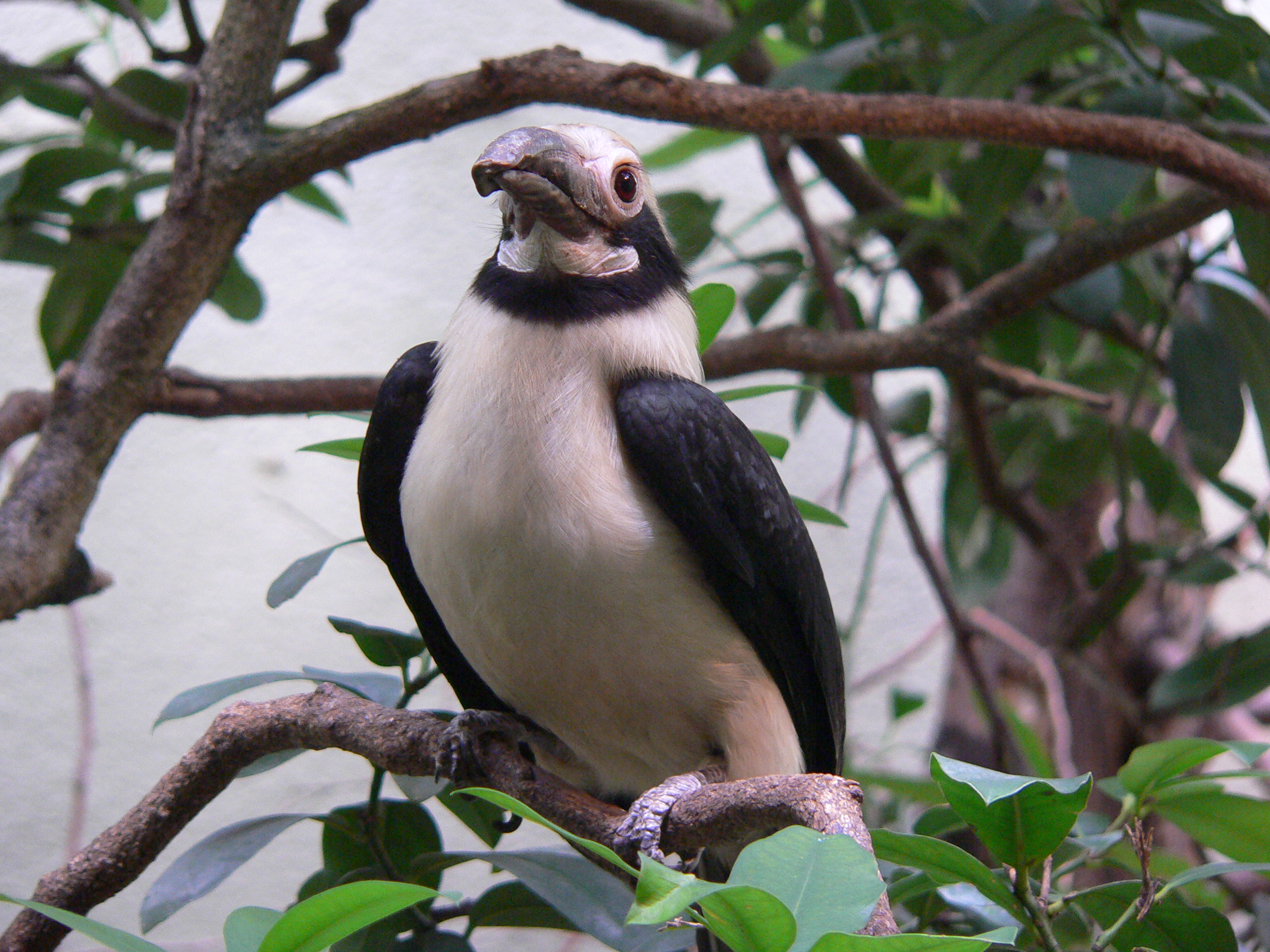
Male

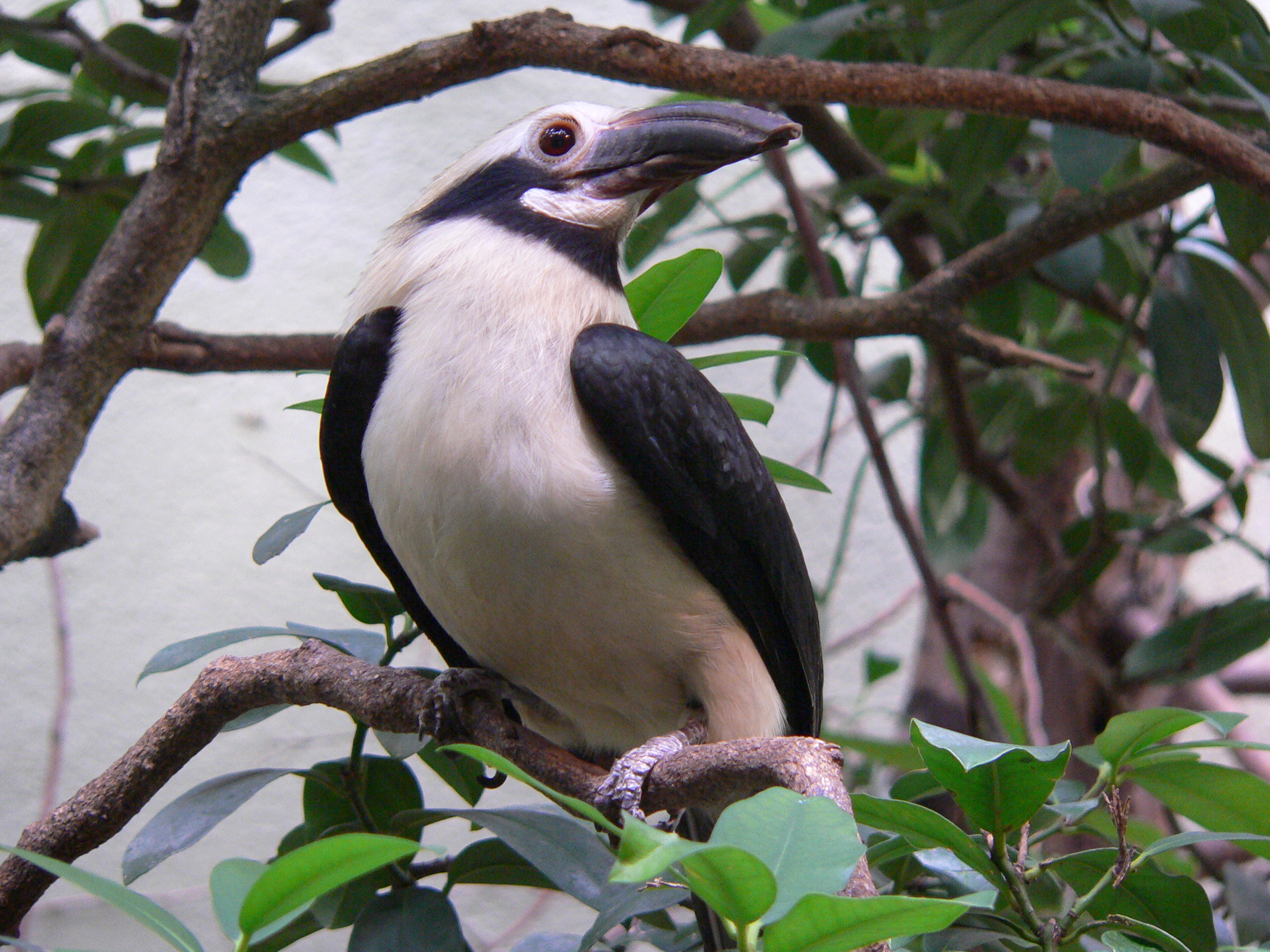
Male

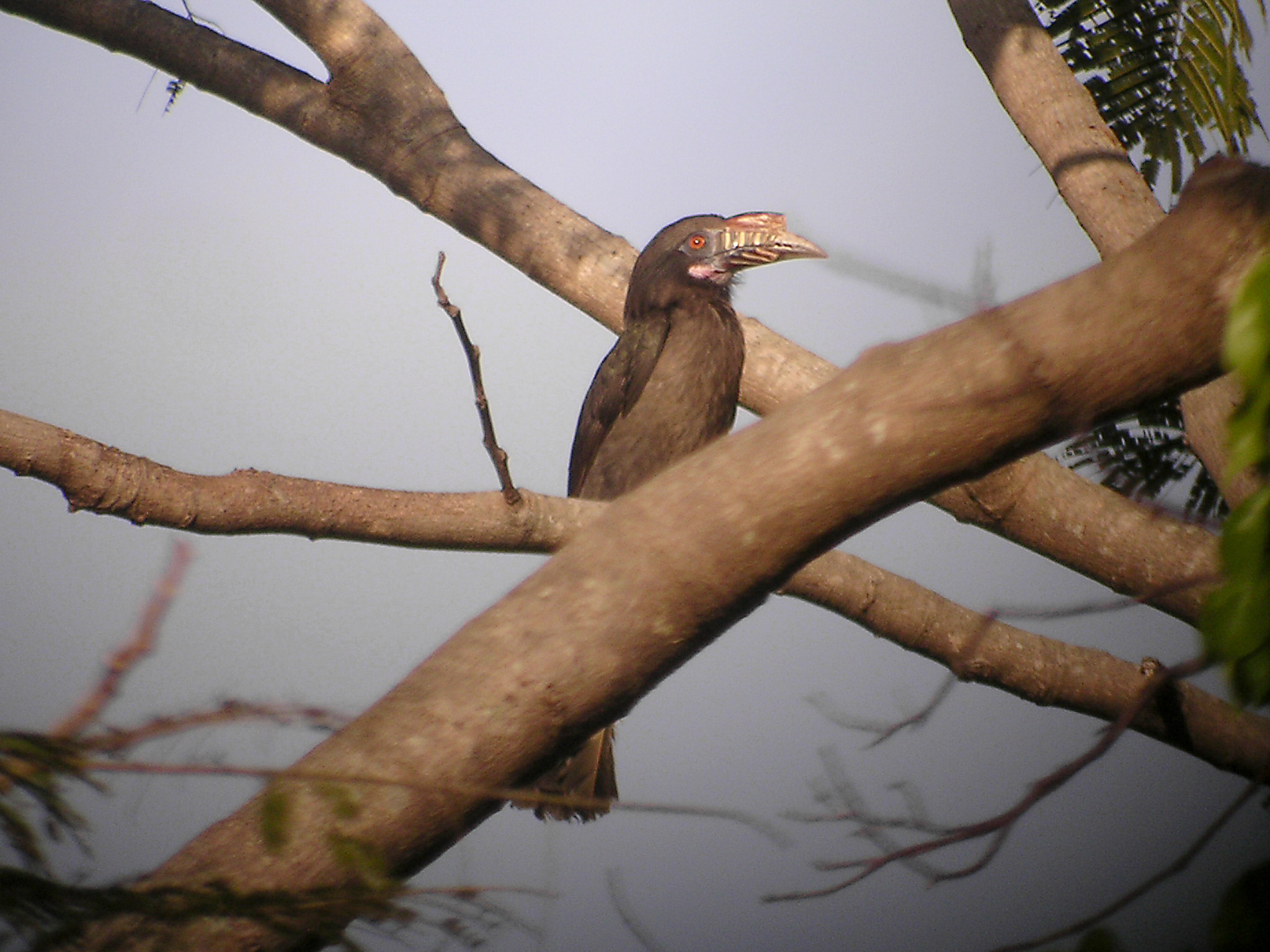
Female

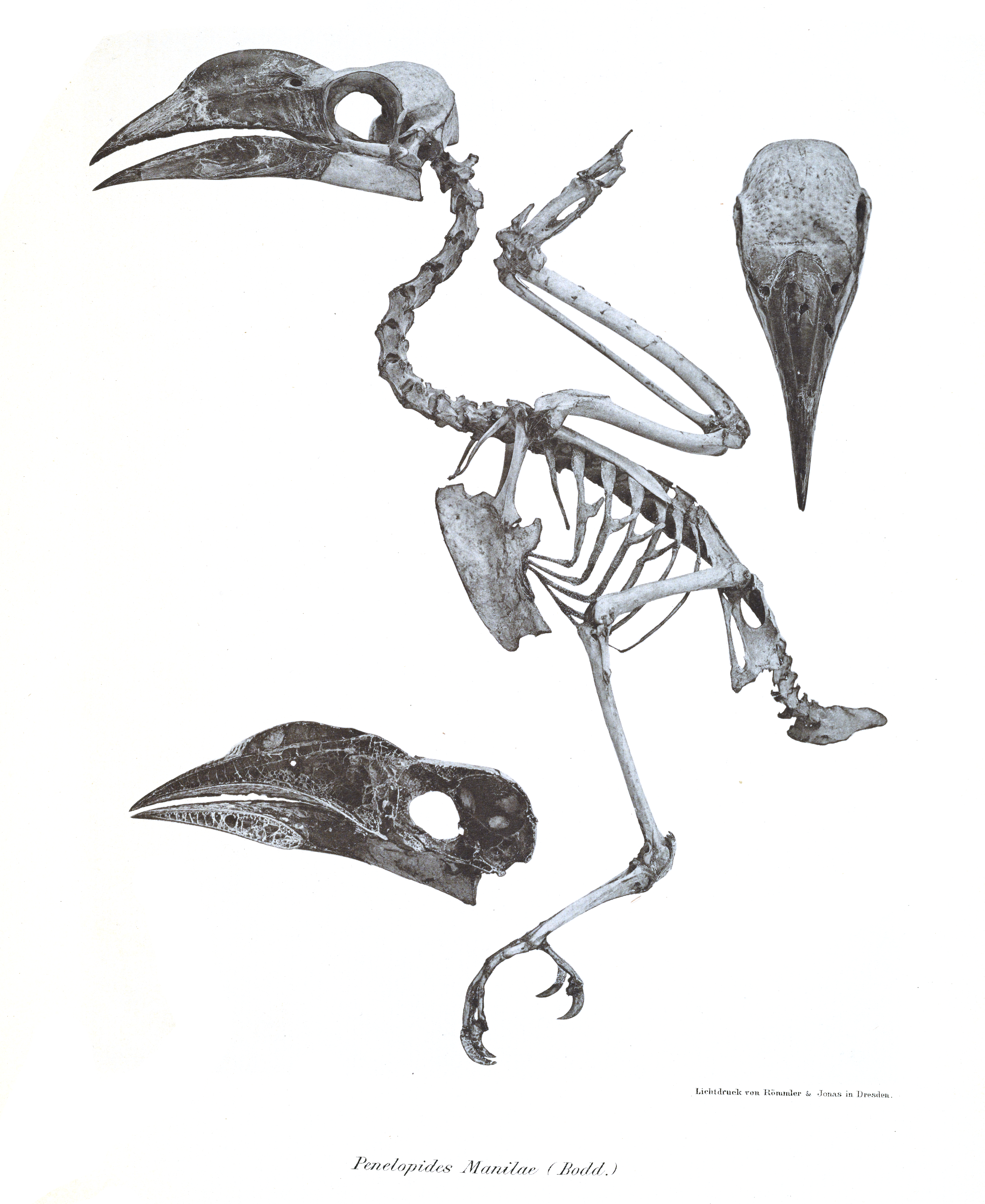
Skeleton
