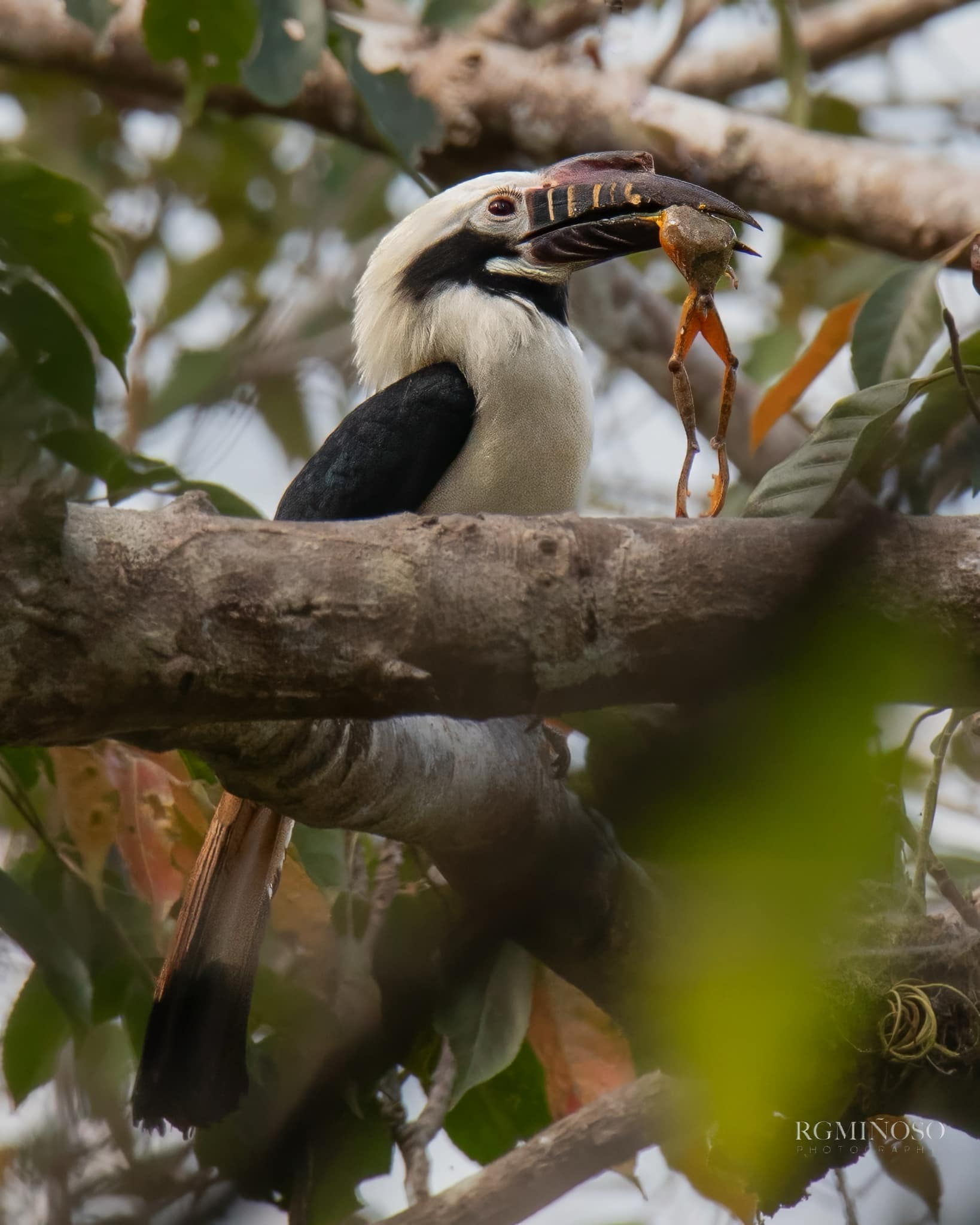
- Male
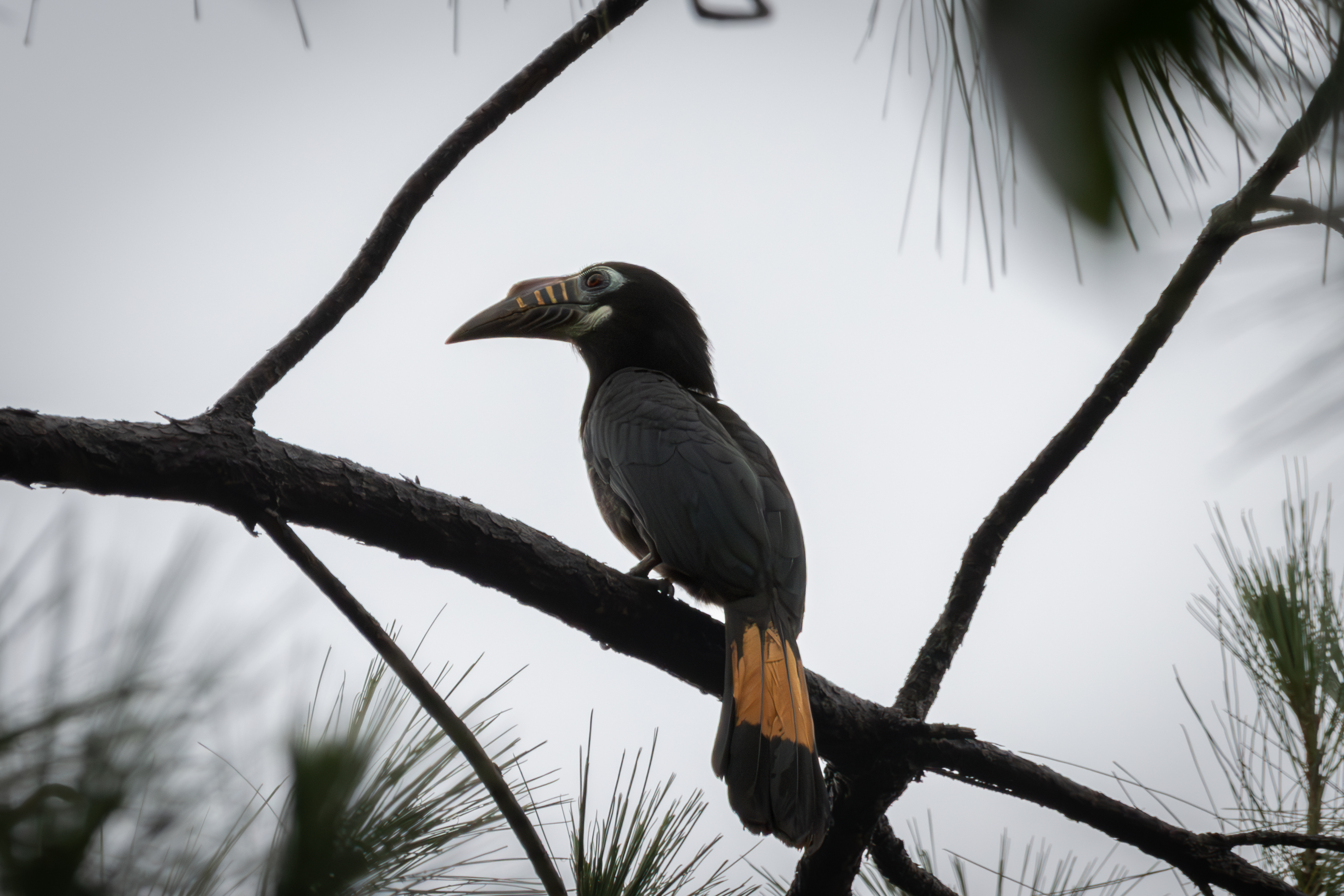
- Female

Conservation status
- Endangered (IUCN 3.1)
- CITES Appendix II

Scientific classification
- Kingdom: Animalia
- Phylum: Chordata
- Class: Aves
- Order: Bucerotiformes
- Family: Bucerotidae
- Genus: Penelopides
- Species: P. panini

Binomial name
- Penelopides panini (Boddaert, 1783)

= Visayan hornbill =

Species of bird

The Visayan hornbill (Penelopides panini) is a hornbill found in tropical moist lowland forests of the Philippines in the Western Visayas region which includes the islands of Panay, Negros and formerly as well as the island of Masbate, and formerly Ticao, in the Philippines. As is the case with all five Philippine tarictic hornbills, formerly considered to be just one species, it is declining due to habitat destruction, hunting and the illegal wildlife trade.

It is illegal to hunt, capture or possess these birds under Philippine Law RA 9147.

== Description ==
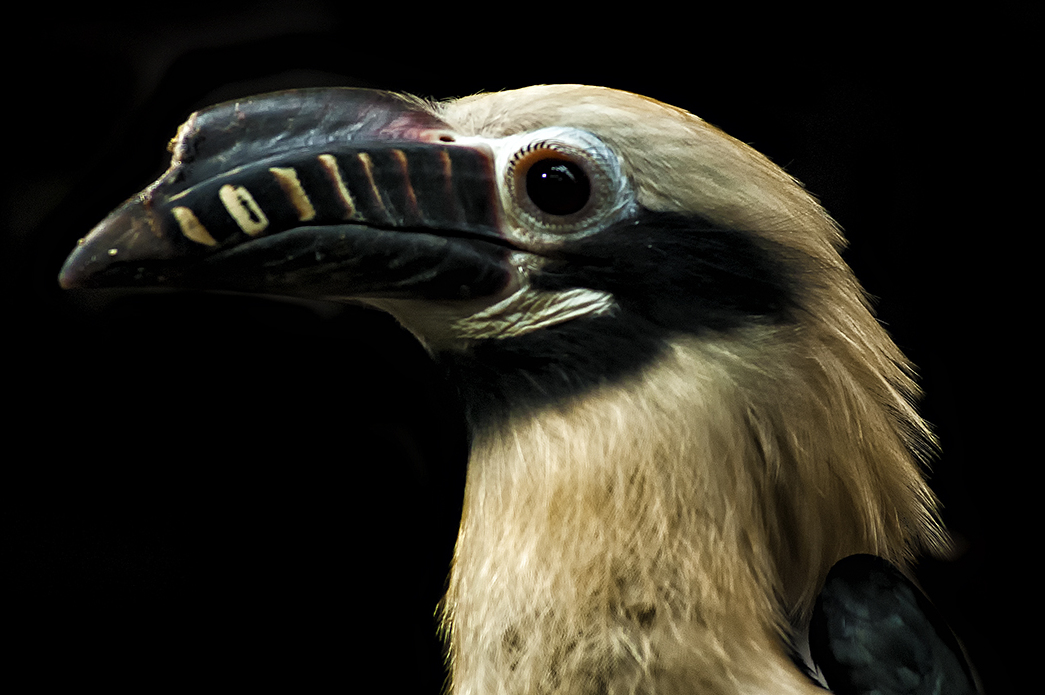
Detail of male's head

The adults show sexual dimorphism. The male has a creamy-white head and neck, a white upper chest, a reddish-brown lower chest and uppertail-coverts, and a creamy-white buff tail with a broad black tip. The bill and casque are blackish; the former with yellowish ridges. The bare ocular skin is pinkish-white. The tail and bill of the female resemble that of the male, but otherwise the plumage of the female is black, and the ocular skin is blue.

Visayan hornbills live in groups and frequent the canopy of rainforests. These birds are noisy and emit an incessant sound that sounds like ta-rik-tik, hence the name. Despite their noise they are difficult to find, being well camouflaged by the dense foliage.

Diet is presumed to be similar to other hornbills namely fruit, seeds, insects and small mammals and reptiles.

== Taxonomy ==
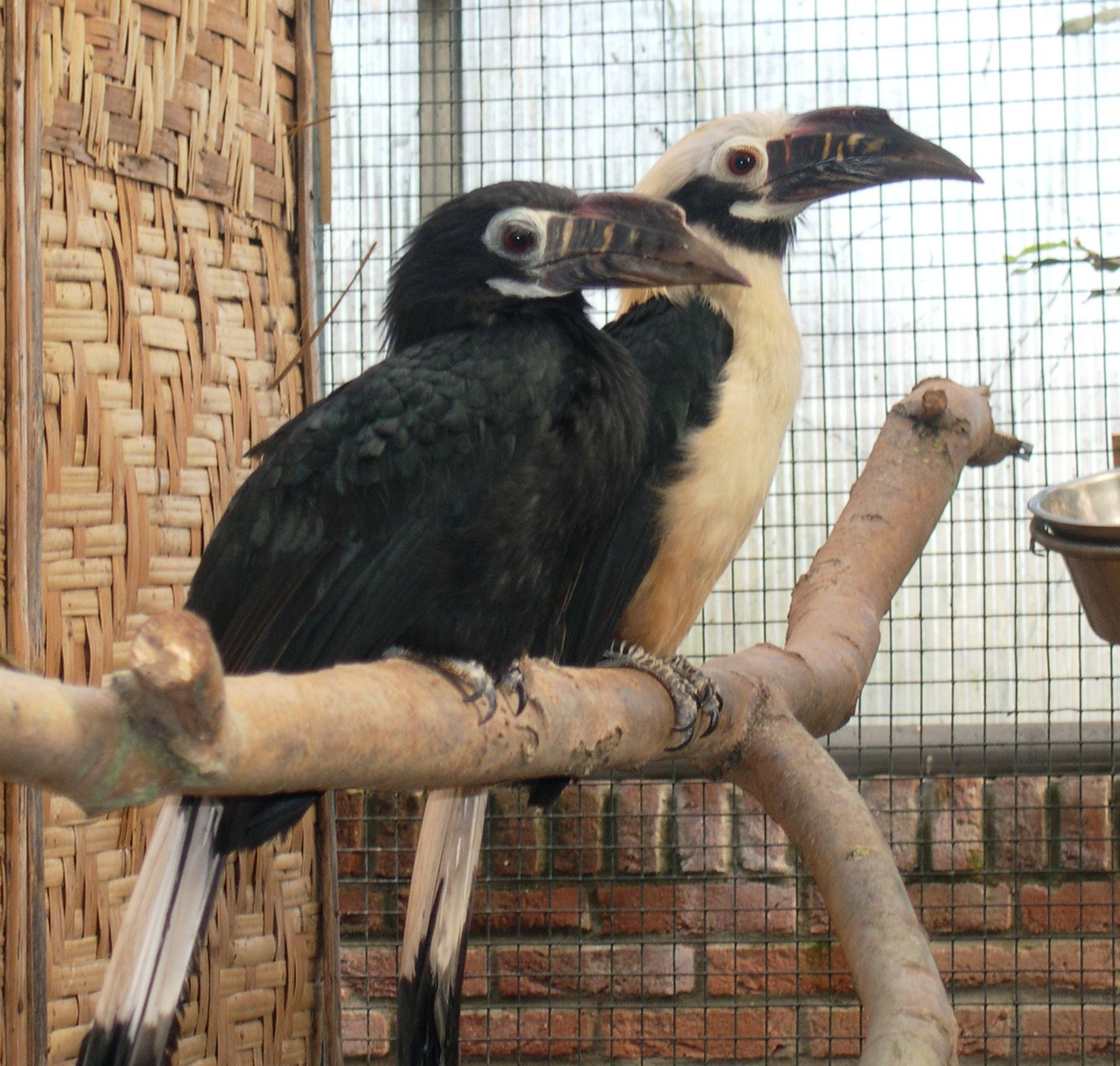
Pair at Avifauna in Alphen aan den Rijn, Netherlands.

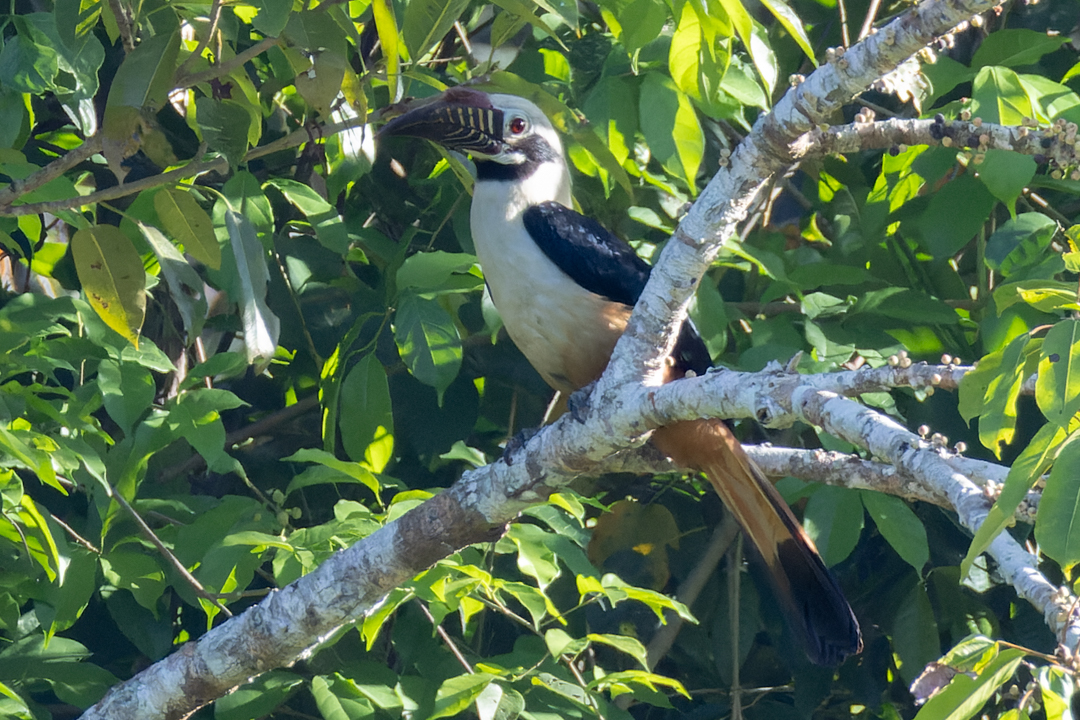
A wild male showing its much browner underparts

The Visayan hornbill was described by the French polymath Georges-Louis Leclerc, Comte de Buffon in 1780 in his Histoire Naturelle des Oiseaux. The bird was also illustrated in a hand-coloured plate engraved by François-Nicolas Martinet in the Planches Enluminées D'Histoire Naturelle which was produced under the supervision of Edme-Louis Daubenton to accompany Buffon's text. Neither the plate caption nor Buffon's description included a scientific name but in 1783 the Dutch naturalist Pieter Boddaert coined the binomial name Buceros panini in his catalogue of the Planches Enluminées. The type locality is the island of Panay in the Philippines. The Visayan hornbill is now placed in the genus Penelopides that was introduced in 1849 by the German naturalist Ludwig Reichenbach in a plate of the hornbills. The origin of the generic name is uncertain but it may be a combination of the Latin pene meaning "almost" or "nearly", the Ancient Greek lophos meaning "crest" and -oideēs "resembling". The specific epithet panini is a Latinized form of "Panay". The common English name refers to the Visayan Islands. These are located in the central part of the Philippines and include the island of Panay.

Formerly was once a single species with the Luzon hornbill, Samar hornbill, Mindanao hornbill and Mindoro hornbill. It is differentiated from the others as it has a black tail with a broad white band. Among the tarictics it has the second highest sound frequency and rapidness in its calls after the Samar hornbill.

=== Subspecies ===
Two subspecies are recognized:

- P. p. panini – (Boddaert, 1783): Visayan tarictic hornbill, nominate, found on Panay, Negros, Masbate and Guimaras
- P. p. ticaensis – Hachisuka, 1930: Ticao tarictic hornbill, found on Ticao Island (likely extinct)

== Ecology and behavior ==
They are primarily frugivorous eating figs and berries but they are also known to eat insects, lizards and other small animals. Usually seen in pairs but can form flocks of up to 15 birds.

All hornbills are monogamous and mate for life.They are cavity nesters and rely on large dipterocarp trees for breeding. The female seals itself within the tree cavity and the male is in charge of gathering food for its mate and chicks. The male stores food in a gular pouch and regurgitates it to feed its mate and chicks.

Cooperative breeding, wherein immature birds from previous seasons help out in feeding the female and chick has not been observed with this species so far. Among Philippine hornbills, it has only been recorded with the Rufous hornbill.

Lays eggs in March to April. Clutch size is typically 2 to 3 eggs. No studied on incubation period but based on Luzon hornbill incubation takes 28 to 31 days. The Visayan hornbill fledgeling occurs within 55 to 58 days of hatching.

== Habitat and conservation ==
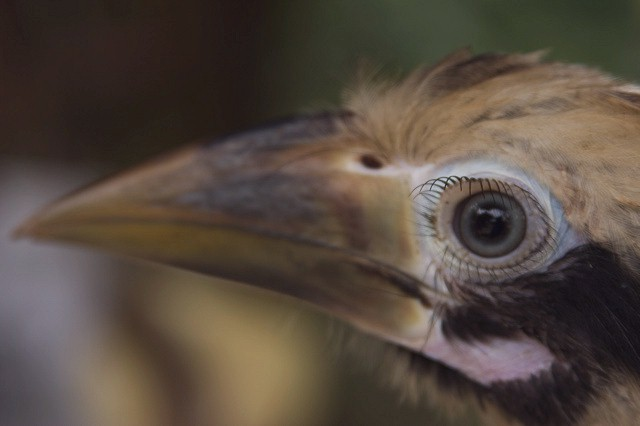
Tarictic hornbill chick surrendered to researchers in Panay, Philippines.

This is a highly endangered species. The International Union for Conservation of Nature assessment from the year 2000 estimates that there are 1,200 individuals remaining in the wild.

This species' main threat is habitat loss with wholesale clearance of forest habitats as a result of logging, agricultural conversion and mining activities occurring within the range. Negros Island is one of the most deforested areas in the country due to its sugar industry and logging with most of its forests being totally lost before the 21st century. Forest cover on Negros and Panay is just 3% and 6% respectively and these figures are still declining.

However, there is conflicting data as the Philippine Biodiversity Conservation Foundation has counted 3,584 hornbill just on the island of Negros. More surveys are required to verify these claims.

The subspecies ticaensis was described as "abundant" in 1905, but almost the entire forest on the island was replaced by plantations and settlements in the 20th century. The last time the Ticao tarictic was seen was in 1971, and it is now likely to be extinct. If confirmed, this is the first taxon of hornbill to go extinct in recorded history; many other taxa in the family are now at risk.

It occurs in a few protected areas within Mt. Kanlaon Natural Park and Northern Negros Natural Park; however, protection and enforcement against deforestation is lax. It also occurs in the proposed Central Panay Mountain Range Park which contains the largest block of remaining forest in the Western Visayas, and the tourist destination of Twin Lakes (Mount Talinis). Both sites benefit from conservation funding but are still under threat by deforestation.

== In captivity ==
This bird is widely kept in captivity but due to the taxonomic reoragnization of the tarictic hornbill species complex it is unknown if these birds are of pure descent.

This species has just been imported from Panay in the Philippines by Chester Zoo, England. There are two pairs at Chester, and two pairs at Avifauna in the Netherlands, amongst other collections.

In the past, the Los Angeles Zoo has bred this species, but it is not known whether these birds were pure Penelopides panini panini, so it may not be the first captive breeding of this species; that title may go to a breeding centre on Panay, where Chester's birds came from. The Chester zoo has bred this species.

Talarak Foundation, based in Negros, has bred multiple pure blooded Visayan hornbills.
