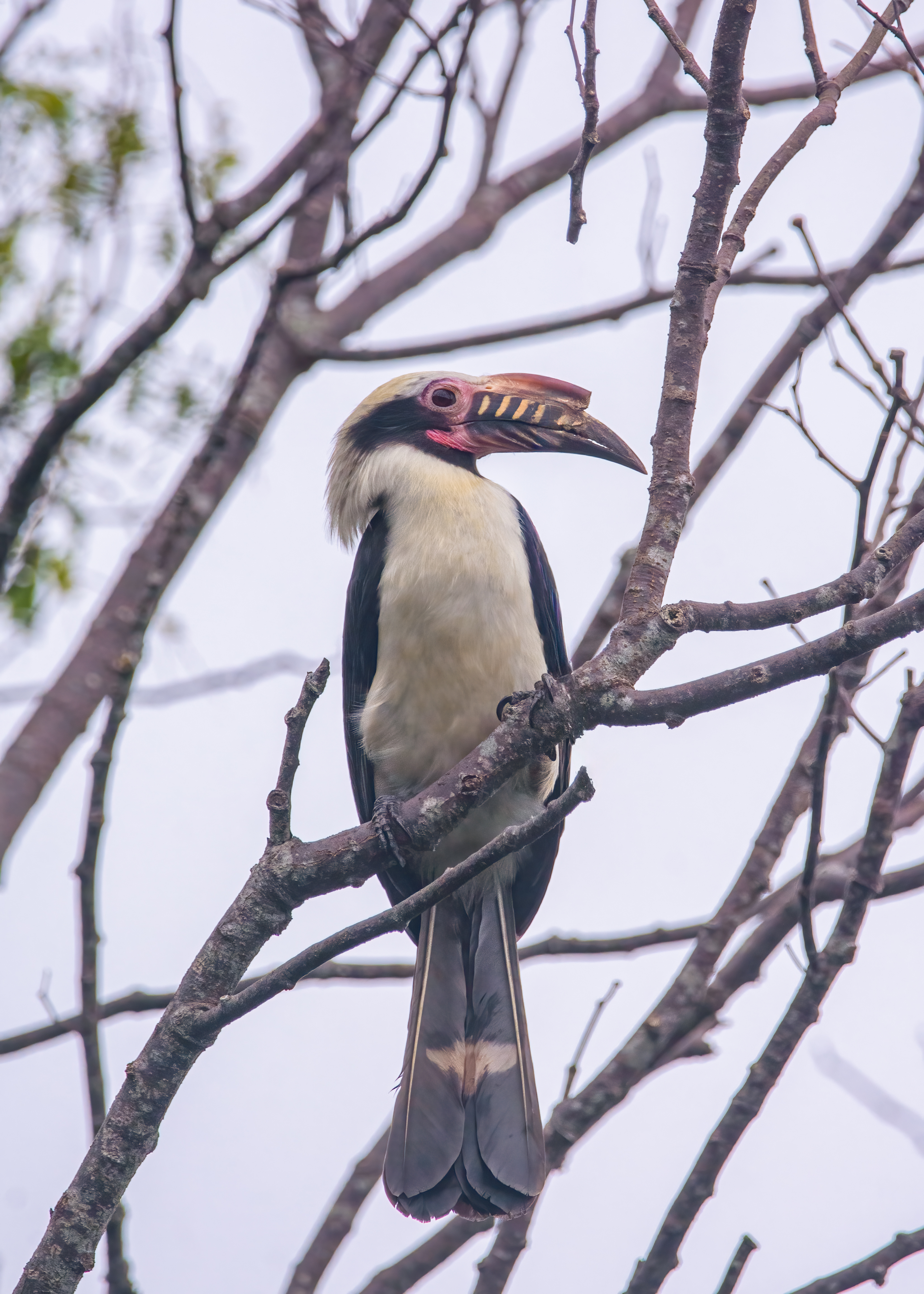
- Luzon hornbill (Penelopides manillae)

Scientific classification
- Kingdom: Animalia
- Phylum: Chordata
- Class: Aves
- Order: Bucerotiformes
- Family: Bucerotidae
- Genus: Penelopides; Reichenbach, 1849

Type species
- Buceros panini Boddaert, 1783

Species
- 2-5, see text

= Penelopides =

Genus of birds

Penelopides is a genus of relatively small, primarily frugivorous hornbills restricted to forested areas of the Philippines. Their common name, tarictic hornbills, is an onomatopoetic reference to the main call of several of them. They have a ridged plate-like structure on the base of their mandible. All are sexually dimorphic: males of all species are whitish-buff and black, while females of all species except the Mindoro hornbill are primarily black.

== Taxonomy ==
The genus Penelopides was introduced in 1849 by the German naturalist Ludwig Reichenbach in a plate of the hornbills. The type species was subsequently designated as the Visayan hornbill (Penelopides panini) by the English zoologist George Gray. The origin of Reichenbach's generic name is uncertain. It may be a combination of the Latin pene meaning "almost" or "nearly", the Ancient Greek lophos meaning "crest" and -oidēs "resembling".

While the taxonomic history of the Sulawesi hornbill has been uneventful, the number of species in the Philippine Archipelago has been greatly debated. Traditionally, only a single Philippine species was recognized, the tarictic hornbill (P. panini). Following a review, it was recommended that it should be split into four allopatric species, the Visayan (P. panini), Luzon (P. manillae), Mindanao (P. affinis), and Mindoro (P. mindorensis). Today most authorities accept this split, although some have recommended splitting the Samar (P. samarensis) from the Mindanao.

The genus contains five species:

Image	Scientific name	Common name	Distribution
	Penelopides panini	Visayan hornbill	islands of Panay, Negros, Masbate, and Guimaras, and formerly Ticao, in the Philippines.
	Penelopides manillae	Luzon hornbill	Luzon and nearby islands in the northern Philippines
	Penelopides affinis	Mindanao hornbill	Mindanao, Dinagat, Siargao and Basilan in the southern Philippines
	Penelopides samarensis	Samar hornbill	islands of Samar, Calicoan, Leyte and Bohol in the east-central Philippines
	Penelopides mindorensis	Mindoro hornbill	Mindoro in the Philippines
