= Hudhud =

Hudhud may refer to:

- Hoopoe (Arabic: هُدْهُد, romanized: hudhud), birds found across Africa, Asia, and Europe
- Solomon's hoopoe, Islamic bird
- Cyclone Hudhud, 2014 cyclone in Asia
- Hudhud ni Aliguyon, a Philippine epic poem
