= August Lueders =

German-American author

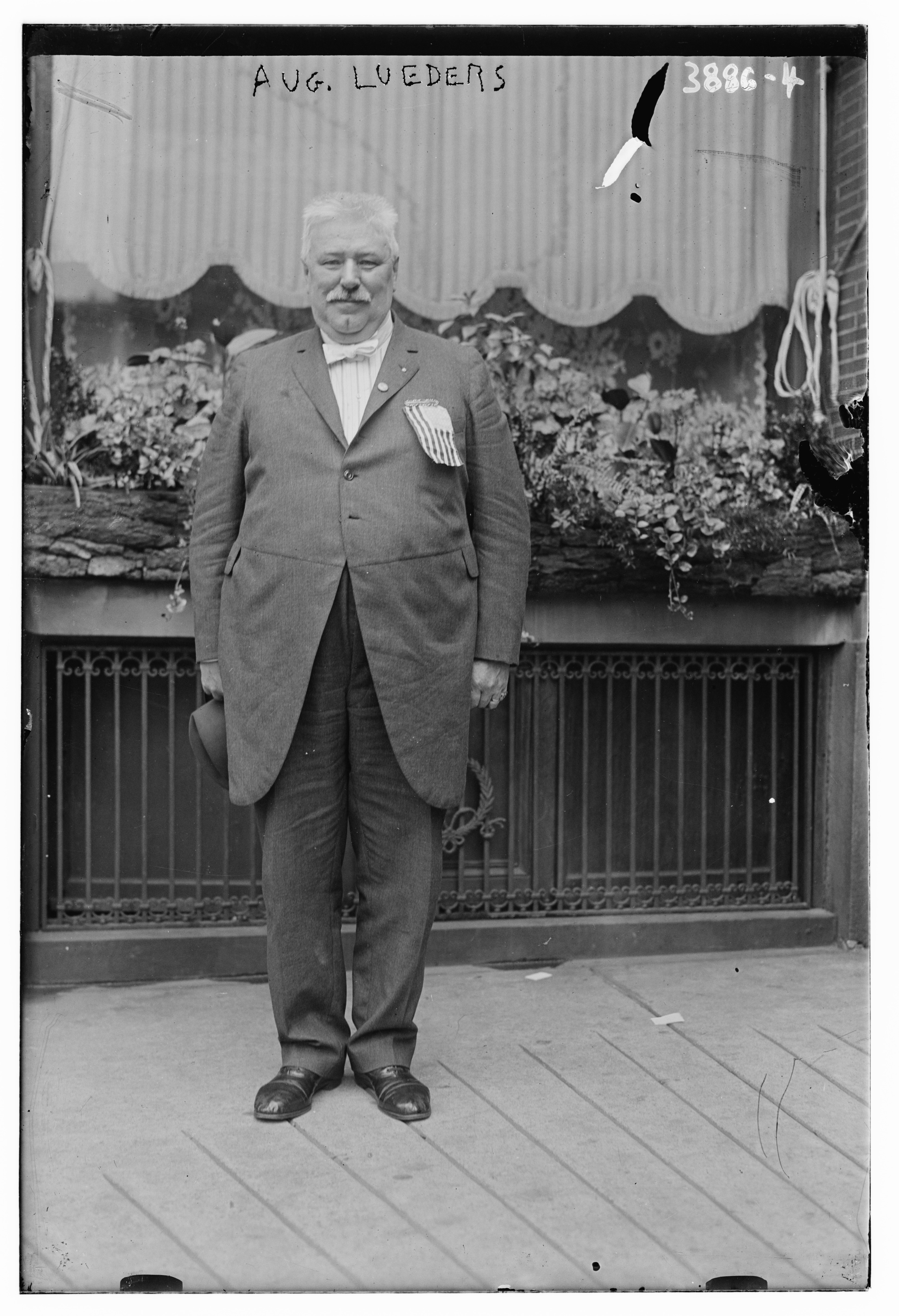
- Lueders at the 1916 Democratic National Convention in St. Louis
- Born: August 24, 1853; Armstedt, Germany
- Died: December 18, 1929 (aged 76); Hinsdale, Illinois, United States
- Parent(s): Hartwig Lueders; Margaret Christine Seligmann

August W. Lueders (August 24, 1853 – December 18, 1929) was an author. He served as the chairman of the board of election commissioners in Chicago, Illinois. He was a delegate to the 1916 Democratic National Convention.

== Biography ==
He was born on August 24, 1853, in Armstedt, Duchy of Holstein, then under the control of Denmark but also in the German Confederation. His parents were Hartwig Lueders of Armstedt and Margaret Christine Seligmann of Ascheberg, Schleswig-Holstein.

His family left Hamburg, Germany, on July 22, 1868, on the steamer Holstein. They arrived in the United States on August 3, 1868, at 4:00 am in New York City. The next day they left for Chicago, Illinois, on an immigrant train and arrived on Saturday, August 8, 1868, at 10:00 am.

In 1874, he became a policeman in Chicago, Illinois. He married Lena Freese on September 12, 1879, in Chicago. They had a son, Dr. August Henry Lueders, who was the commissioner of the Chicago Department of Public Health. He served as a member of the board of election commissioners in Chicago, Illinois, from 1914 to 1920.

He attended the 1916 Democratic National Convention in St. Louis.

He published his autobiography in 1929, Sixty Years in Chicago.

He died on December 18, 1929, in Hinsdale, Illinois.
