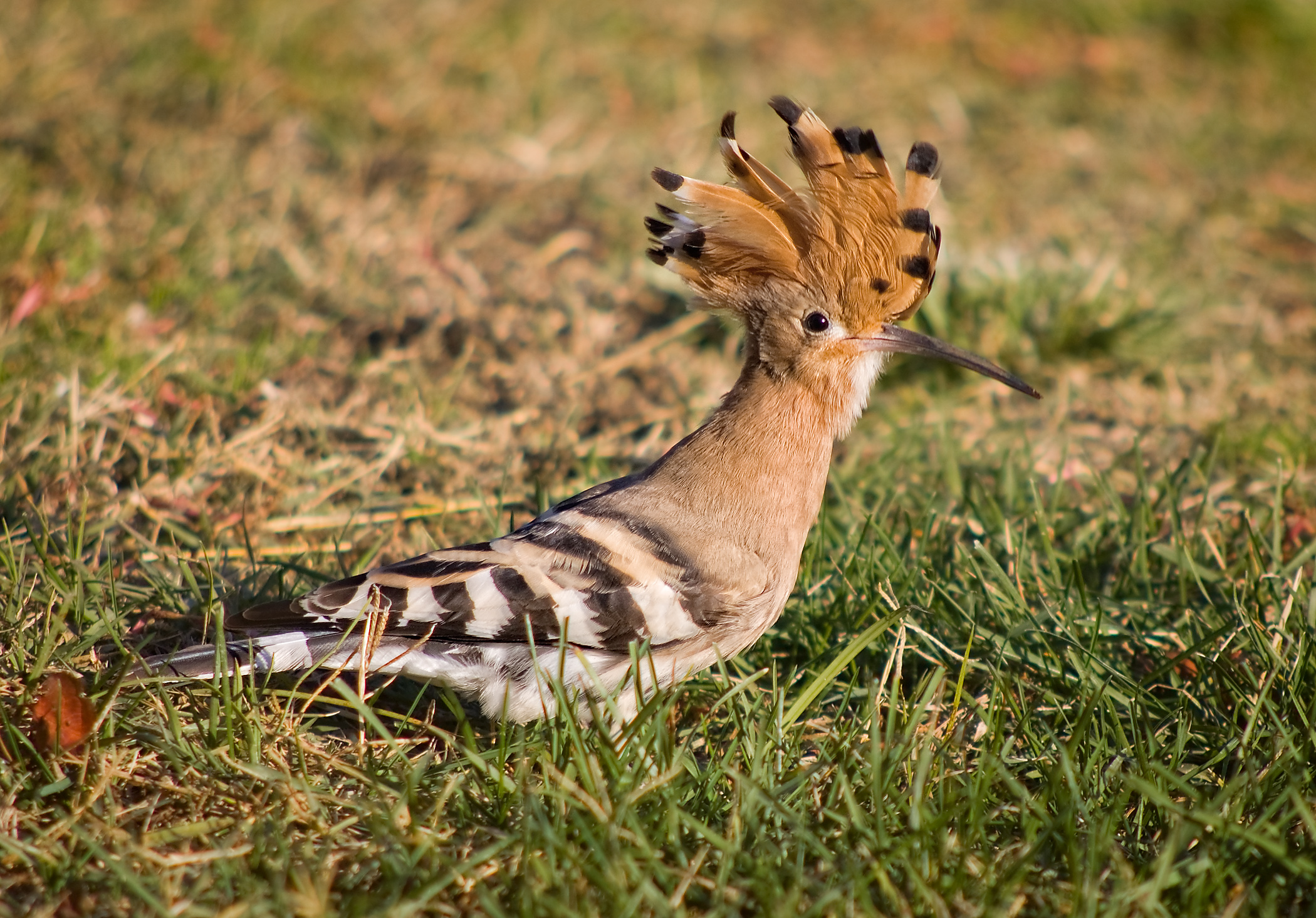
- Common hoopoe
- Madagascar hoopoe

Scientific classification
- Kingdom: Animalia
- Phylum: Chordata
- Class: Aves
- Order: Bucerotiformes
- Family: Upupidae; Leach, 1819
- Genus: Upupa; Linnaeus, 1758

Type species
- Upupa epops (Common hoopoe) Linnaeus, 1758

Species
- †Upupa antaios; Upupa epops; Upupa marginata

Audio
- Common hoopoe

= Hoopoe =

Monotypic family of birds

Hoopoes (/ˈhuːpuː, ˈhuːpoʊ/) are colourful birds found across Africa, Asia, and Europe, notable for their distinctive "crown" of feathers which can be raised or lowered at will. Two living and one extinct species are recognized, though for many years both extant species were lumped as a single species – Upupa epops. In fact, some taxonomists still consider the species to be conspecific. On the other hand, some authorities recognize three living species, with the African hoopoe (U. africana) treated as separate from the common hoopoe (U. epops). The common hoopoe is common in its range and has a large population, so it is evaluated as Least Concern on the IUCN Red List of Threatened Species. However, its numbers are declining in Western Europe. Conversely, the hoopoe has been increasing in numbers at the tip of the South Sinai, Sharm el-Sheikh. There are dozens of nesting pairs that remain resident all year round.

== Taxonomy ==
The genus Upupa was introduced in 1758 by the Swedish naturalist Carl Linnaeus in the tenth edition of his Systema Naturae. The type species is the common hoopoe (Upupa epops). Upupa and ἔποψ (epops) are respectively the Latin and Ancient Greek names for the hoopoe; both, like the English name, are onomatopoeic forms which imitate the cry of the bird.

The hoopoe was classified in the clade Coraciiformes, which also includes kingfishers, bee-eaters, and rollers. A close relationship between the hoopoe and the wood hoopoes is also supported by the shared and unique nature of their stapes. In the Sibley-Ahlquist taxonomy, the hoopoe is separated from the Coraciiformes as a separate order, the Upupiformes. Some authorities place the wood hoopoes in the Upupiformes as well. The consensus now is that both hoopoe and the wood hoopoes belong with the hornbills in the Bucerotiformes.

The fossil record of the hoopoes is very incomplete, with the earliest fossil coming from the Quaternary. The fossil record of their relatives is older, with fossil wood hoopoes dating back to the Miocene and those of an extinct related family, the Messelirrisoridae, dating from the Eocene.

=== Species ===
Formerly considered a single species, the hoopoe has been split into two separate species: the common hoopoe and the Madagascar hoopoe. One accepted separate species, the Saint Helena hoopoe, lived on the island of St Helena but became extinct in the 16th century, presumably due to introduced species.

The genus Upupa was created by Linnaeus in his Systema naturae in 1758. It then included three other species with long curved bills:

- U. eremita (now Geronticus eremita), the northern bald ibis
- U. pyrrhocorax (now Pyrrhocorax pyrrhocorax), the red-billed chough
- U. paradisea

Formerly, the greater hoopoe-lark (Alaemon alaudipes) was also considered to be a member of this genus (as Upupa alaudipes).

==== Extant species ====
Two extant species are recognised:

| Image | Scientific name | Common name | Distribution |
|---|---|---|---|
| | Upupa epops | Common hoopoe | Europe, Asia, and North Africa and Sub-Saharan Africa |
| | Upupa marginata | Madagascar hoopoe | Madagascar |

== Distribution and habitat ==
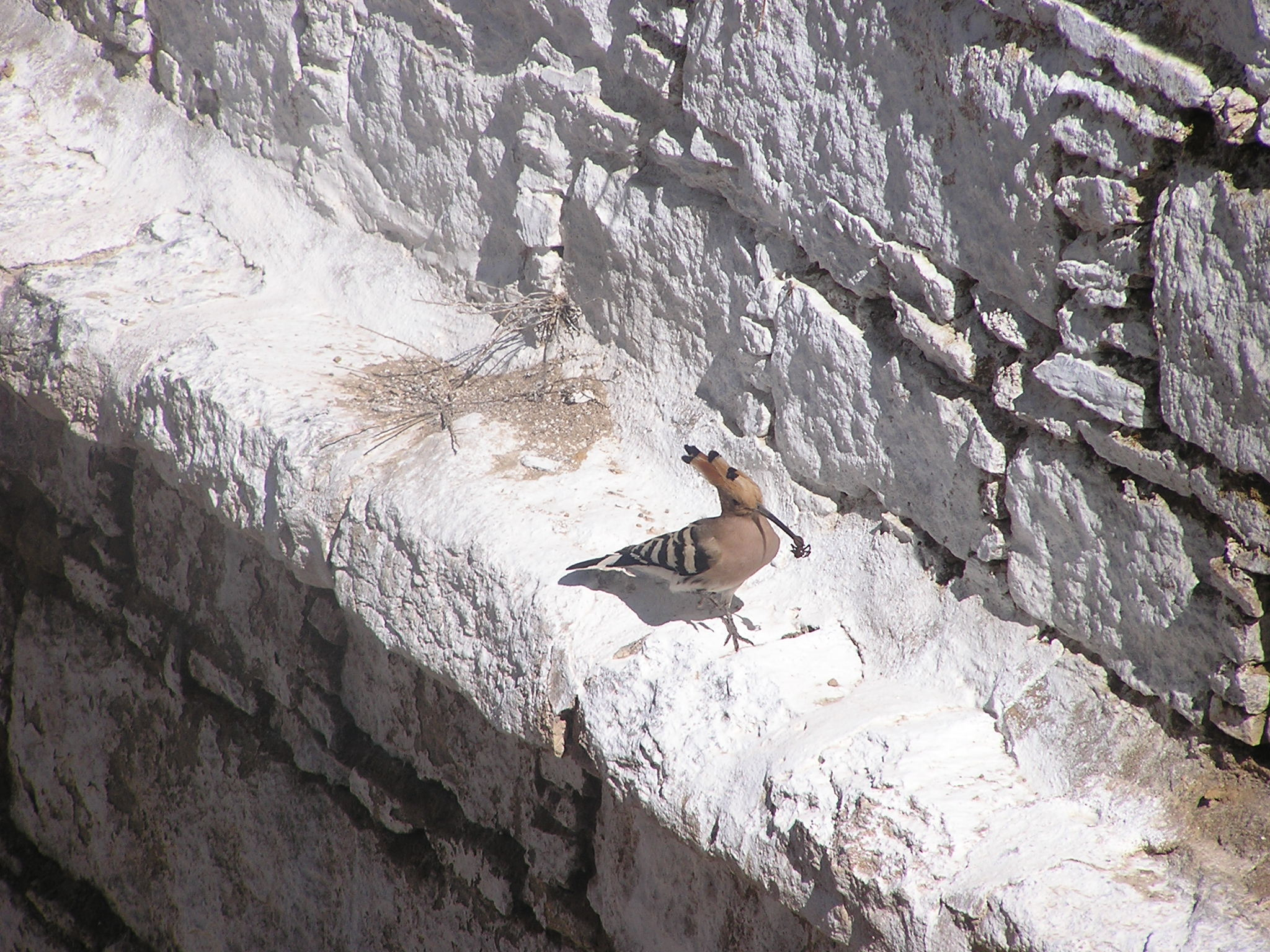
Hoopoe nesting at Ganden Monastery, its crest lowered, Tibet

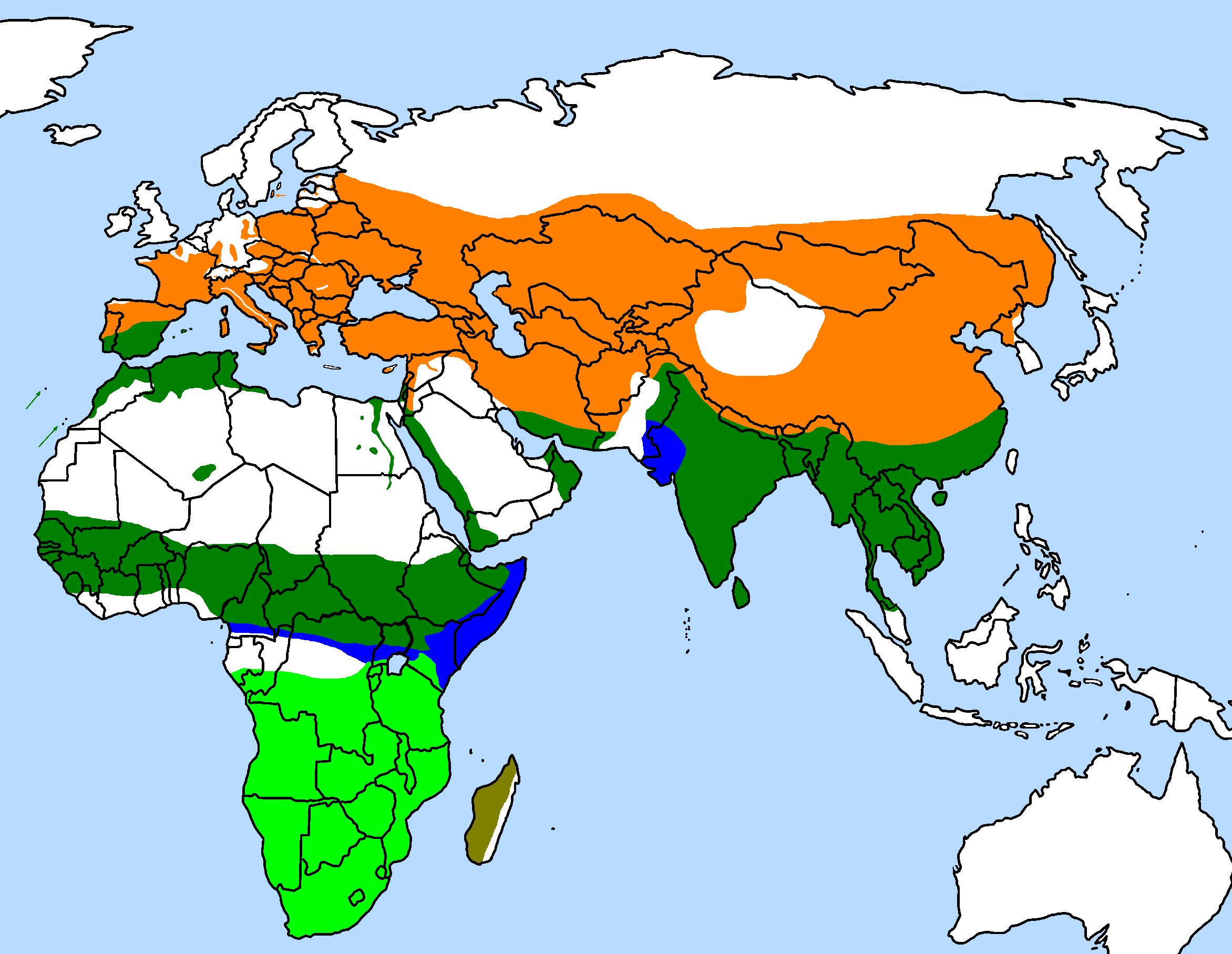
Distribution of Upupa species African hoopoe Common hoopoe (breeding) Common hoopoe (resident) Common hoopoe (wintering) Madagascar hoopoe

Hoopoes are widespread in Europe, Asia, and North Africa, Sub-Saharan Africa and Madagascar. Most European and north Asian birds migrate to the tropics in winter. In contrast, the African populations are sedentary all year. The species has been a vagrant in Alaska; U. e. saturata was recorded there in 1975 in the Yukon Delta. Hoopoes have been known to breed north of their European range, and in southern England during warm, dry summers that provide plenty of grasshoppers and similar insects, although as of the early 1980s northern European populations were reported to be in the decline, possibly due to changes in climate.

The hoopoe has two basic requirements of its habitat: bare or lightly vegetated ground on which to forage and vertical surfaces with cavities (such as trees, cliffs or even walls, nestboxes, haystacks, and abandoned burrows) in which to nest. These requirements can be provided in a wide range of ecosystems, and as a consequence the hoopoe inhabits a wide range of habitats such as heathland, wooded steppes, savannas and grasslands, as well as forest glades. The Madagascar species also makes use of more dense primary forest. The modification of natural habitats by humans for various agricultural purposes has led to hoopoes becoming common in olive groves, orchards, vineyards, parkland and farmland, although they are less common and are declining in intensively farmed areas. Hunting is of concern in southern Europe and Asia.

Hoopoes make seasonal movements in response to rain in some regions such as in Ceylon and in the Western Ghats. Birds have been seen at high altitudes during migration across the Himalayas. One was recorded at about 6,400 m (21,000 ft) by the first Mount Everest expedition.

== Behaviour and ecology ==
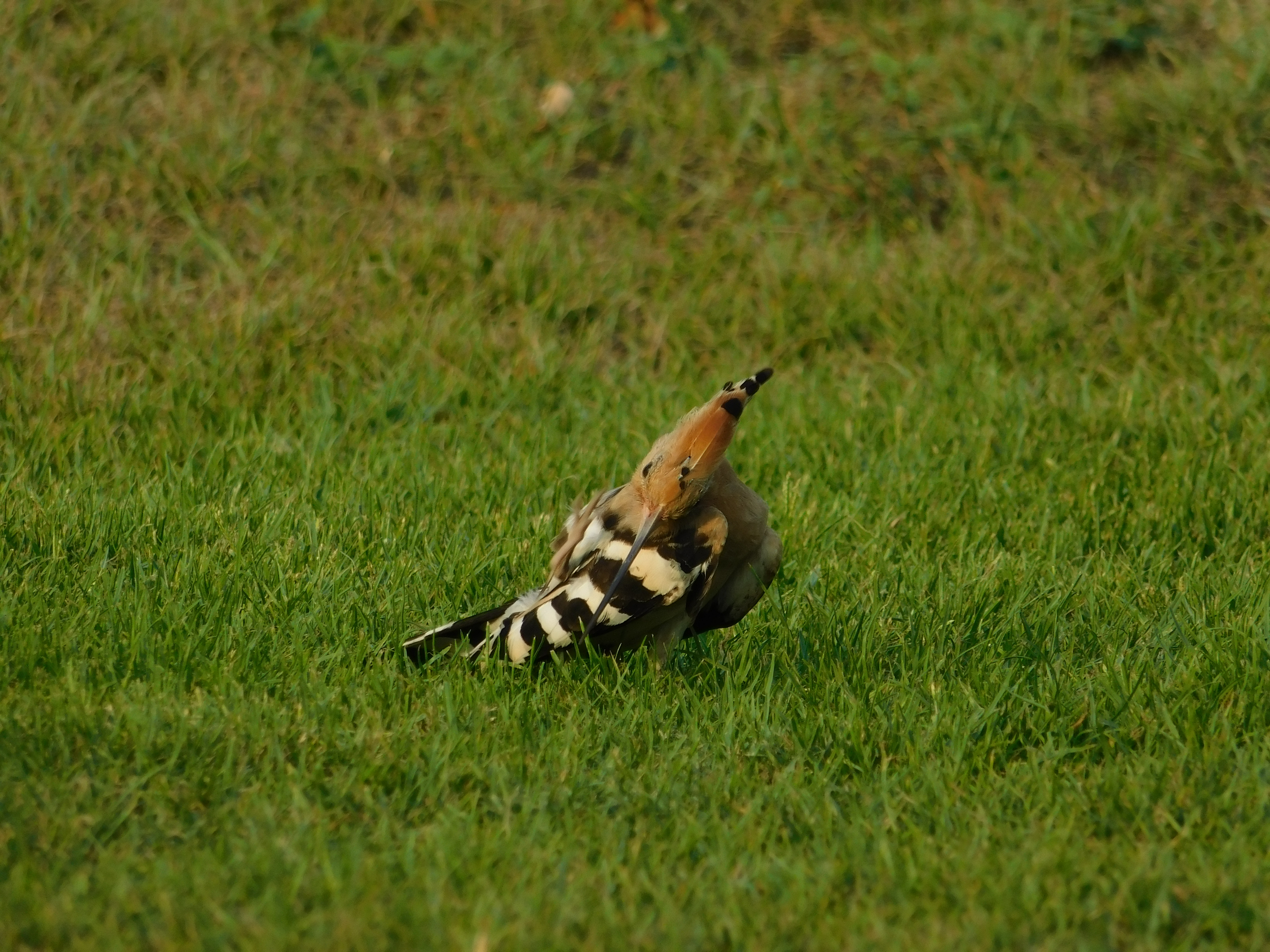
Hoopoe preening in Dubai, United Arab Emirates

In what was long thought to be a defensive posture, hoopoes sunbathe by spreading out their wings and tail low against the ground and tilting their head up; they often fold their wings and preen halfway through. They also enjoy taking dust and sand baths. Adults may begin their moult after the breeding season and continue after they have migrated for the winter. The hoopoe has a high crest, which usually rests horizontally but will lift straight up when the bird is hyped up or frightened.

=== Diet and feeding ===
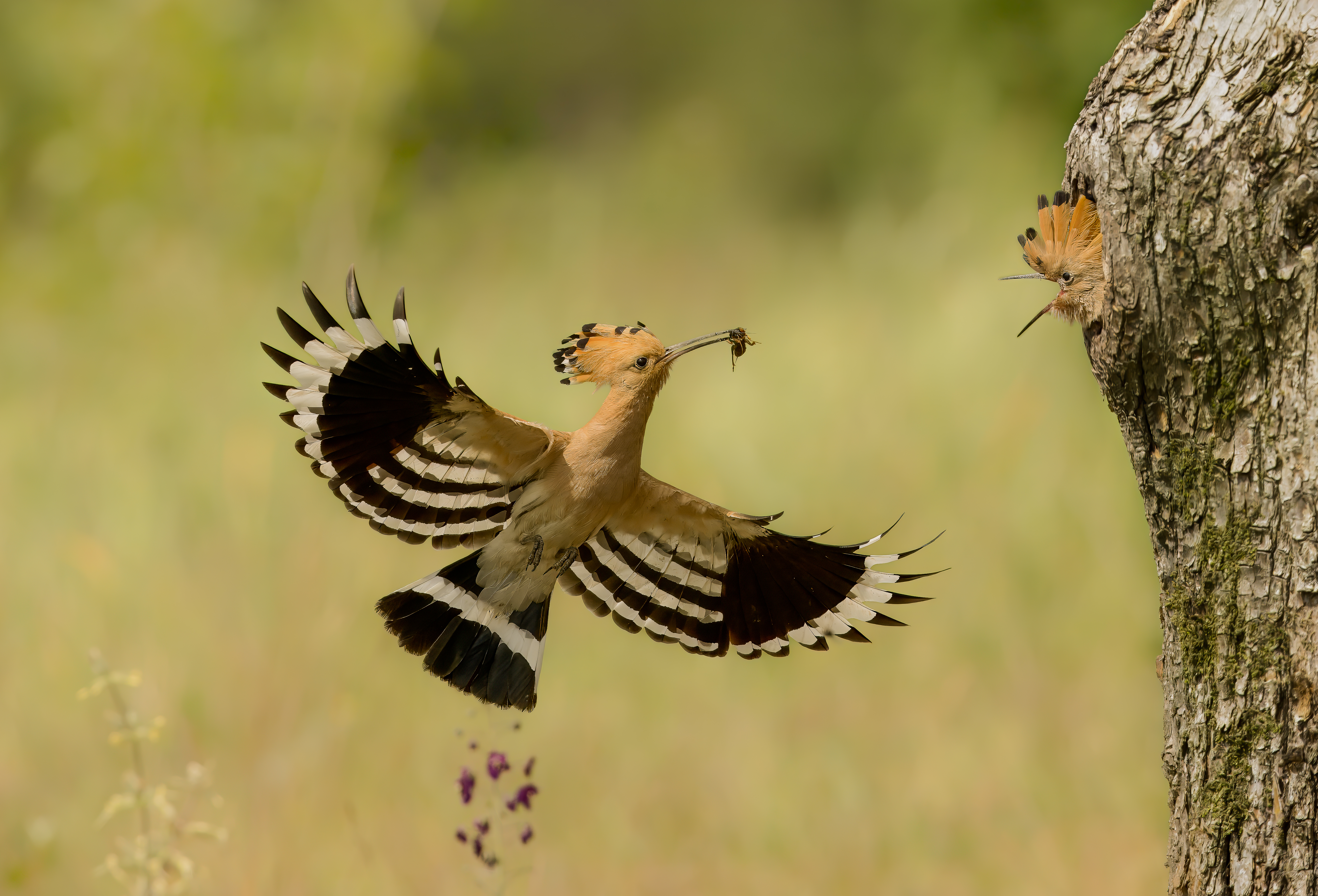
Hoopoe bringing food to the nest in the Pálava PLA, South Moravian Region, Czech Republic

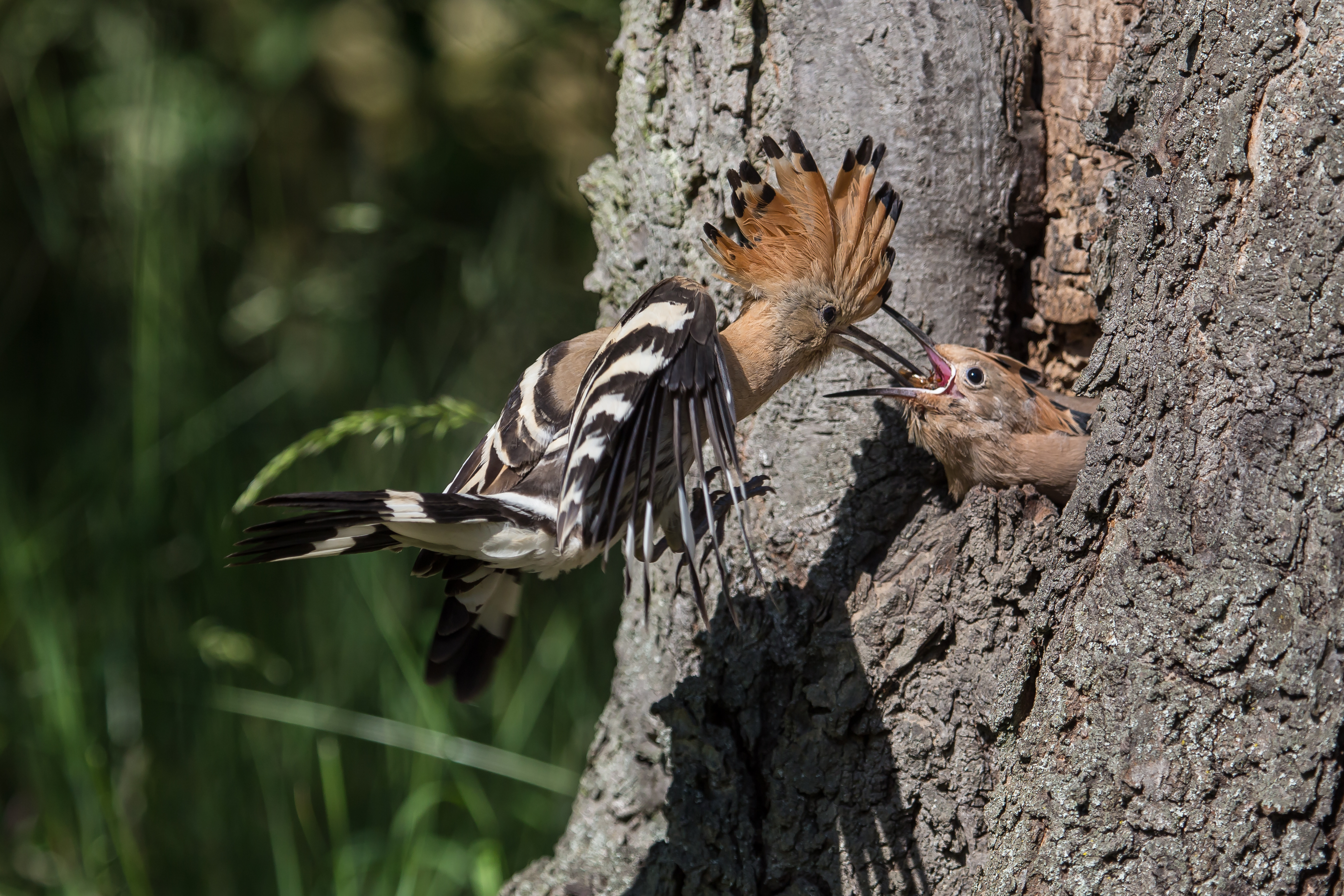
Eurasian hoopoe in the nature reserve Glockenbuckel von Viernheim

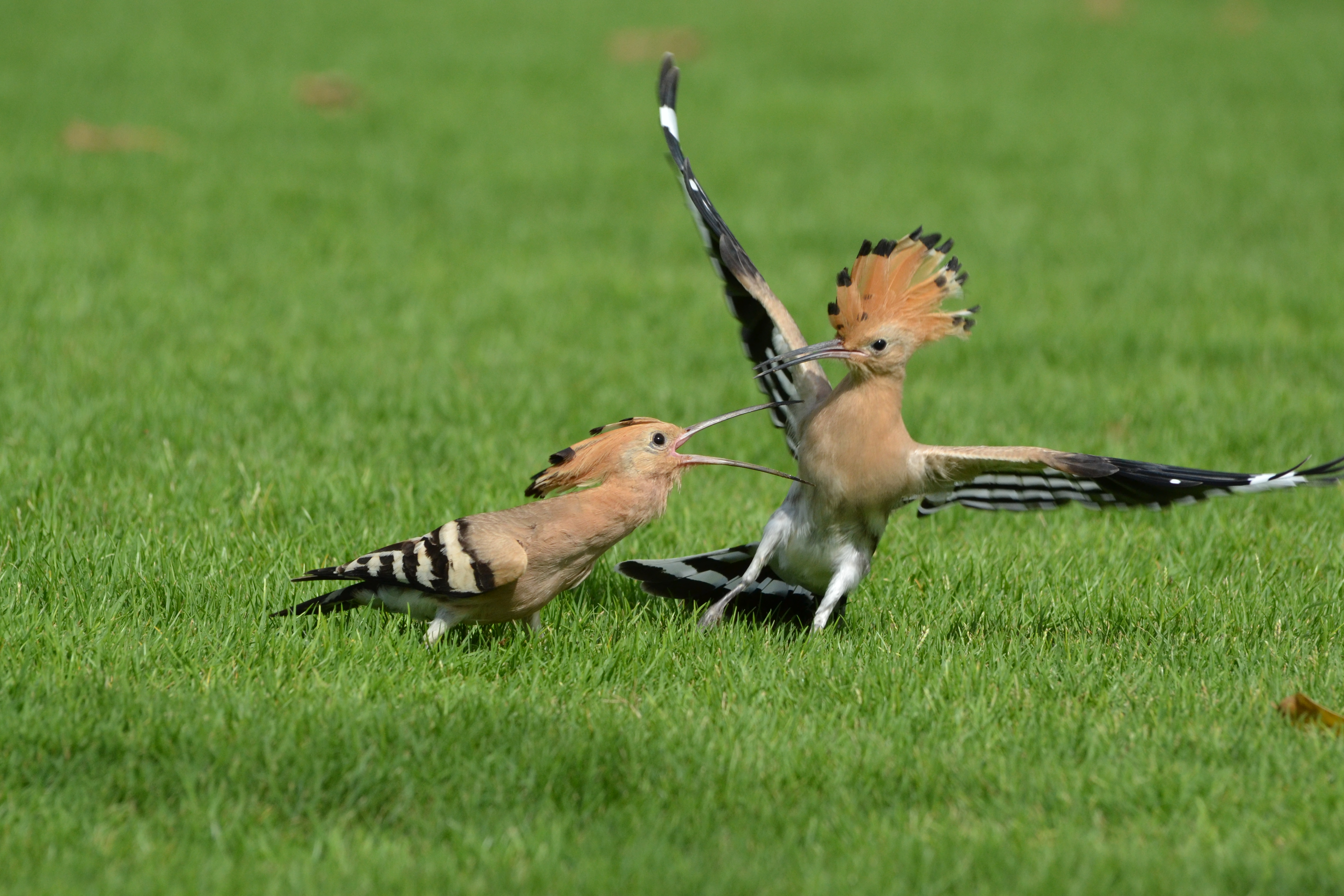
Young and mature hoopoe in Dubai park

A hoopoe feeding in Lengeri village, Assam, India

The diet of the hoopoe is mostly composed of insects, although small reptiles, frogs and plant matter such as seeds and berries are sometimes taken as well. It is a solitary forager which typically feeds on the ground. More rarely they will feed in the air, where their strong and rounded wings make them fast and manoeuverable, in pursuit of numerous swarming insects. More commonly their foraging style is to stride over relatively open ground and periodically pause to probe the ground with the full length of their bill. Insect larvae, pupae and mole crickets are detected by the bill and either extracted or dug out with the strong feet. Hoopoes will also feed on insects on the surface, probe into piles of leaves, and even use the bill to lever large stones and flake off bark. Common diet items include crickets, locusts, beetles, earwigs, cicadas, ant lions, bugs and ants. These can range from 10 to 150 millimetres (0.4 to 5.9 in) in length, with a preferred prey size of around 20–30 millimetres (0.8–1.2 in). Larger prey items are beaten against the ground or a preferred stone to kill them and remove indigestible body parts such as wings and legs.

=== Breeding ===
Hoopoes are monogamous, although the pair bond apparently only lasts for a single season. They are also territorial. The male calls frequently to advertise his ownership of the territory. Chases and fights between rival males (and sometimes females) are common and can be brutal. Birds will try to stab rivals with their bills, and individuals are occasionally blinded in fights. The nest is in a hole in a tree or wall, and has a narrow entrance. It may be unlined, or various scraps may be collected. The female alone is responsible for incubating the eggs. Clutch size varies with location: Northern Hemisphere birds lay more eggs than those in the Southern Hemisphere, and birds at higher latitudes have larger clutches than those closer to the equator. In central and northern Europe and Asia the clutch size is around 12, whereas it is around four in the tropics and seven in the subtropics. The eggs are round and milky blue when laid, but quickly discolour in the increasingly dirty nest. They weigh 4.5 grams (0.16 oz). A replacement clutch is possible. When food is bountiful, the female will lay a few extra eggs for the purpose of providing food for chicks that have already hatched. In a study done in Spain, it was found that nests with a higher incidence of cannibalism successfully fledged more chicks than in nests where hatchlings weren't fed to older chicks.

Hoopoes have well-developed anti-predator defences in the nest. The uropygial gland of the incubating and brooding female is quickly modified to produce a foul-smelling liquid, and the glands of nestlings do so as well. These secretions are rubbed into the plumage. The secretion, which smells like rotting meat, is thought to help deter predators, as well as deter parasites and possibly act as an antibacterial agent. The secretions stop soon before the young leave the nest. From the age of six days, nestlings can also direct streams of faeces at intruders, and will hiss at them in a snake-like fashion. The young also strike with their bill or with one wing.

The incubation period for the species is between 15 and 18 days, during which time the male feeds the female. Incubation begins as soon as the first egg is laid, so the chicks are born asynchronously. The chicks hatch with a covering of downy feathers. By around day three to five, feather quills emerge which will become the adult feathers. The chicks are brooded by the female for between 9 and 14 days. The female later joins the male in the task of bringing food. The young fledge in 26 to 29 days and remain with the parents for about a week more.

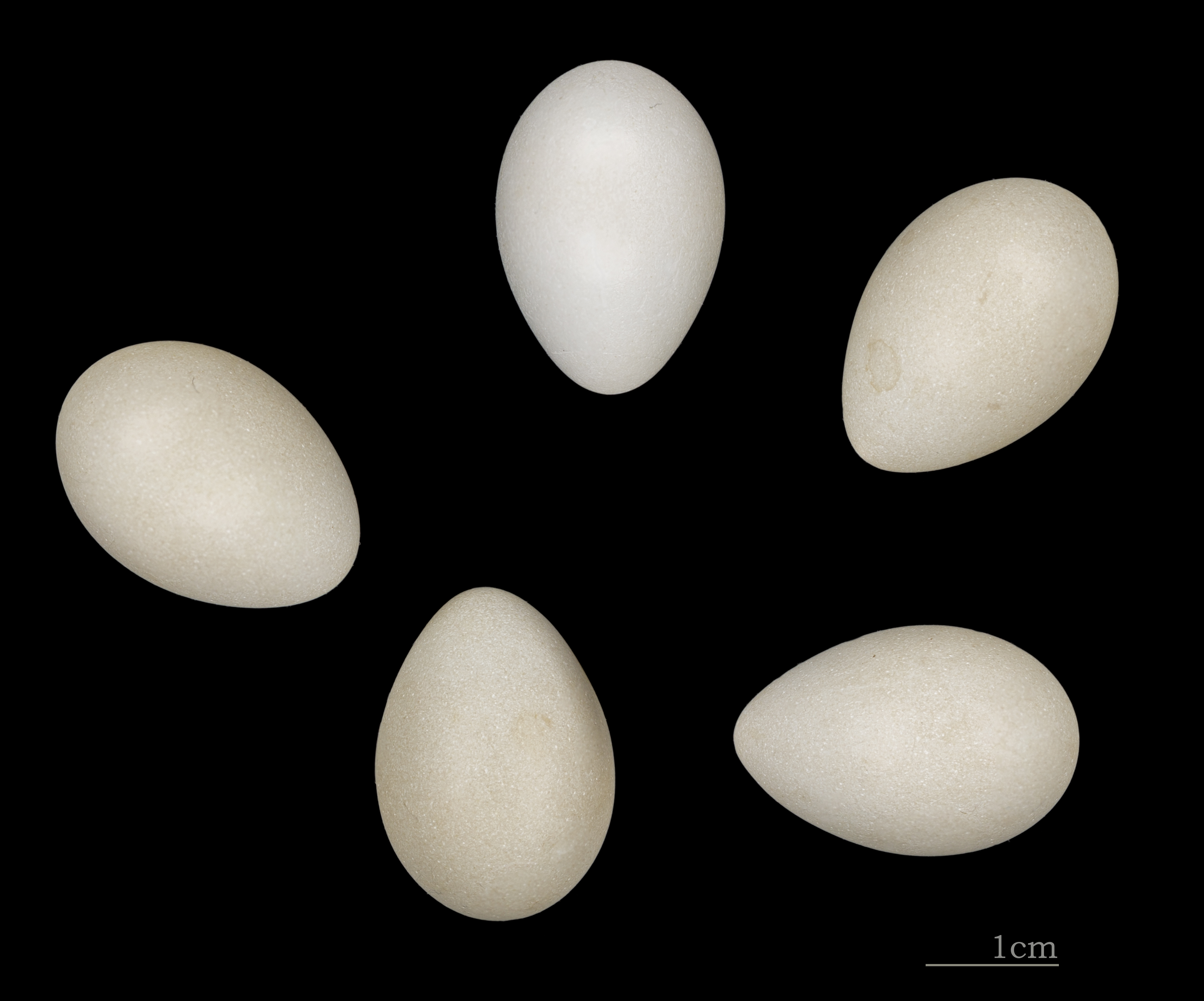
Hoopoe eggs (Muséum de Toulouse)

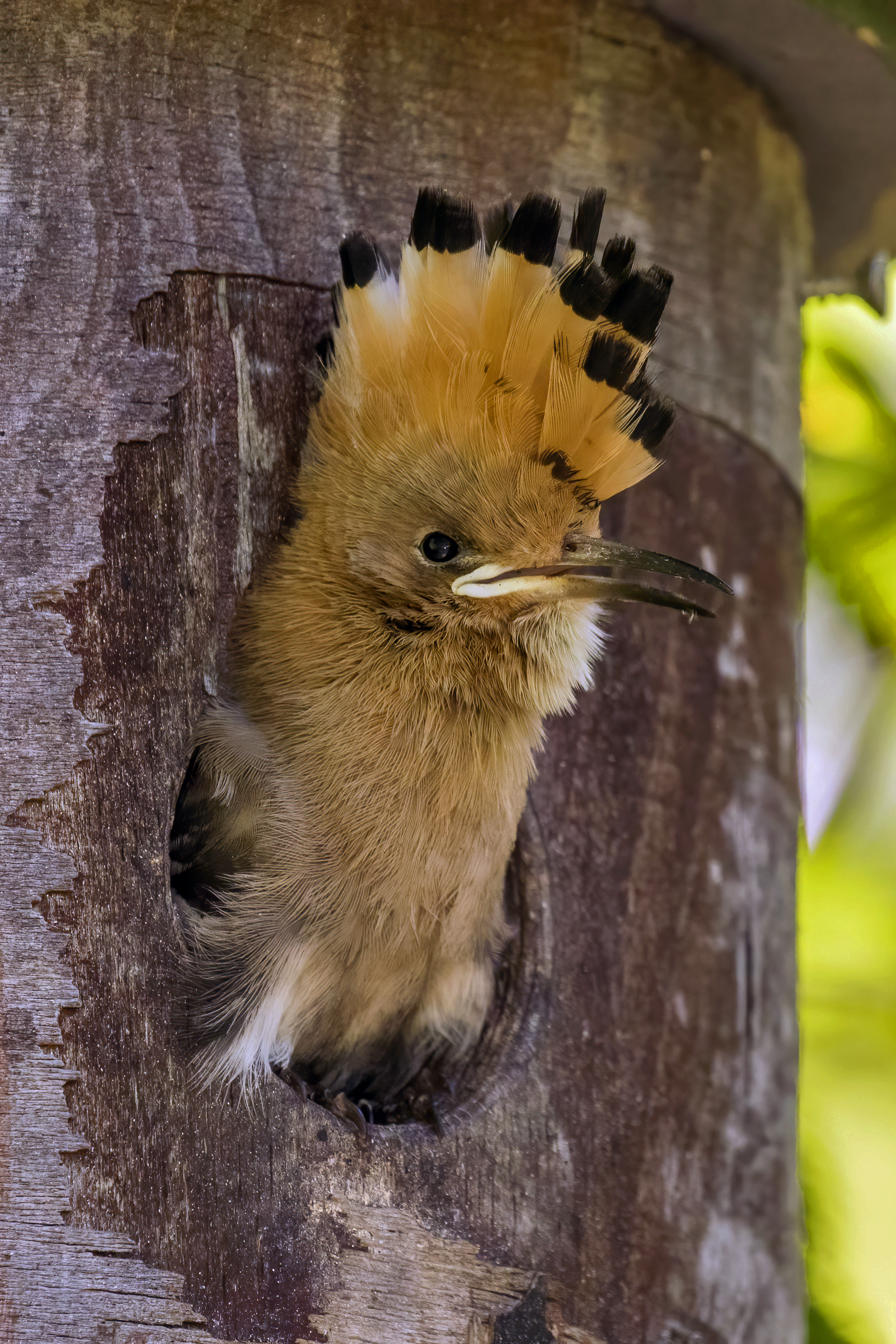
Juvenile in nest box, Hungary

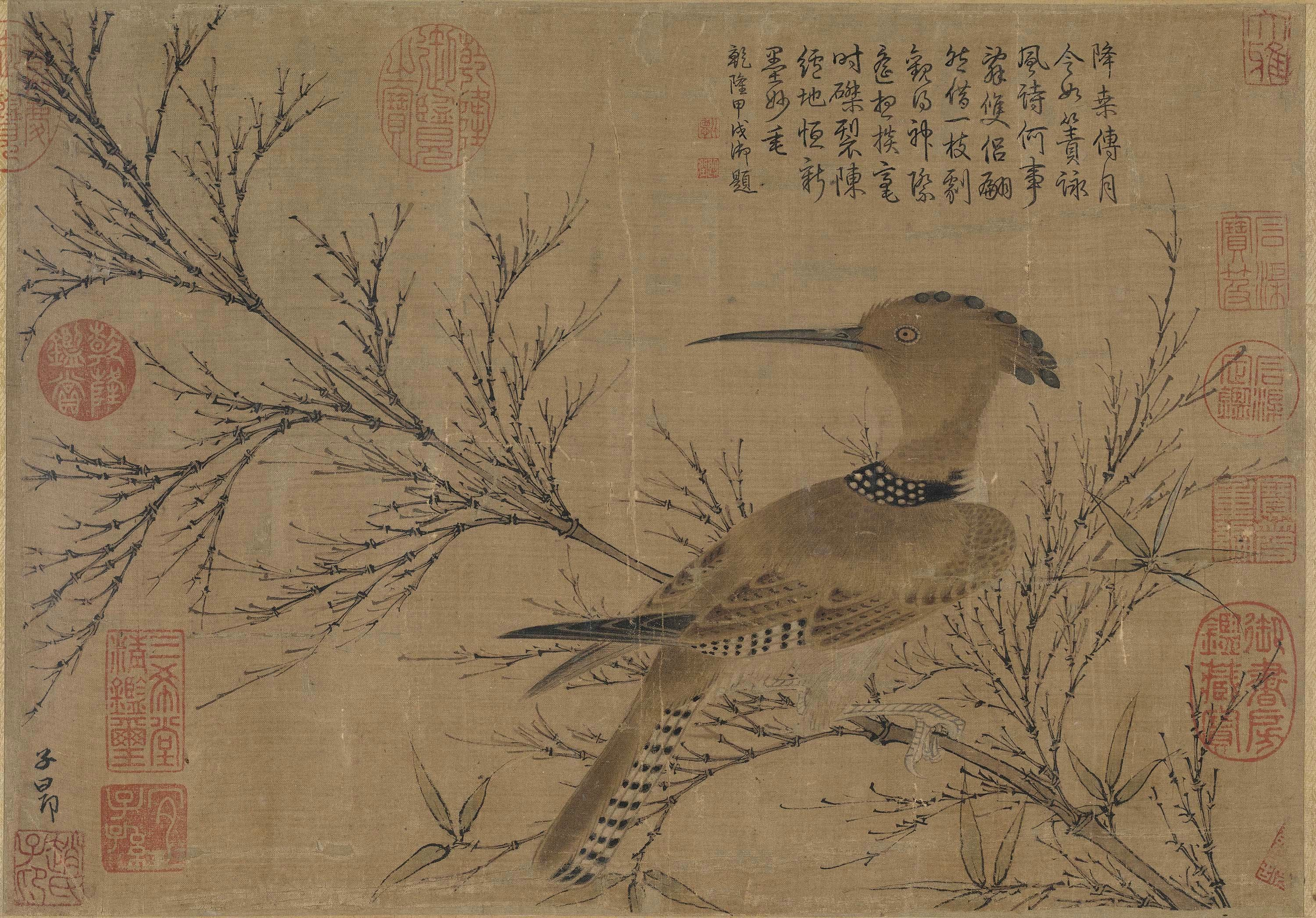
Hoopoe on Bamboo by Zhao Mengfu, c. 1254–1322 (Shanghai Museum)

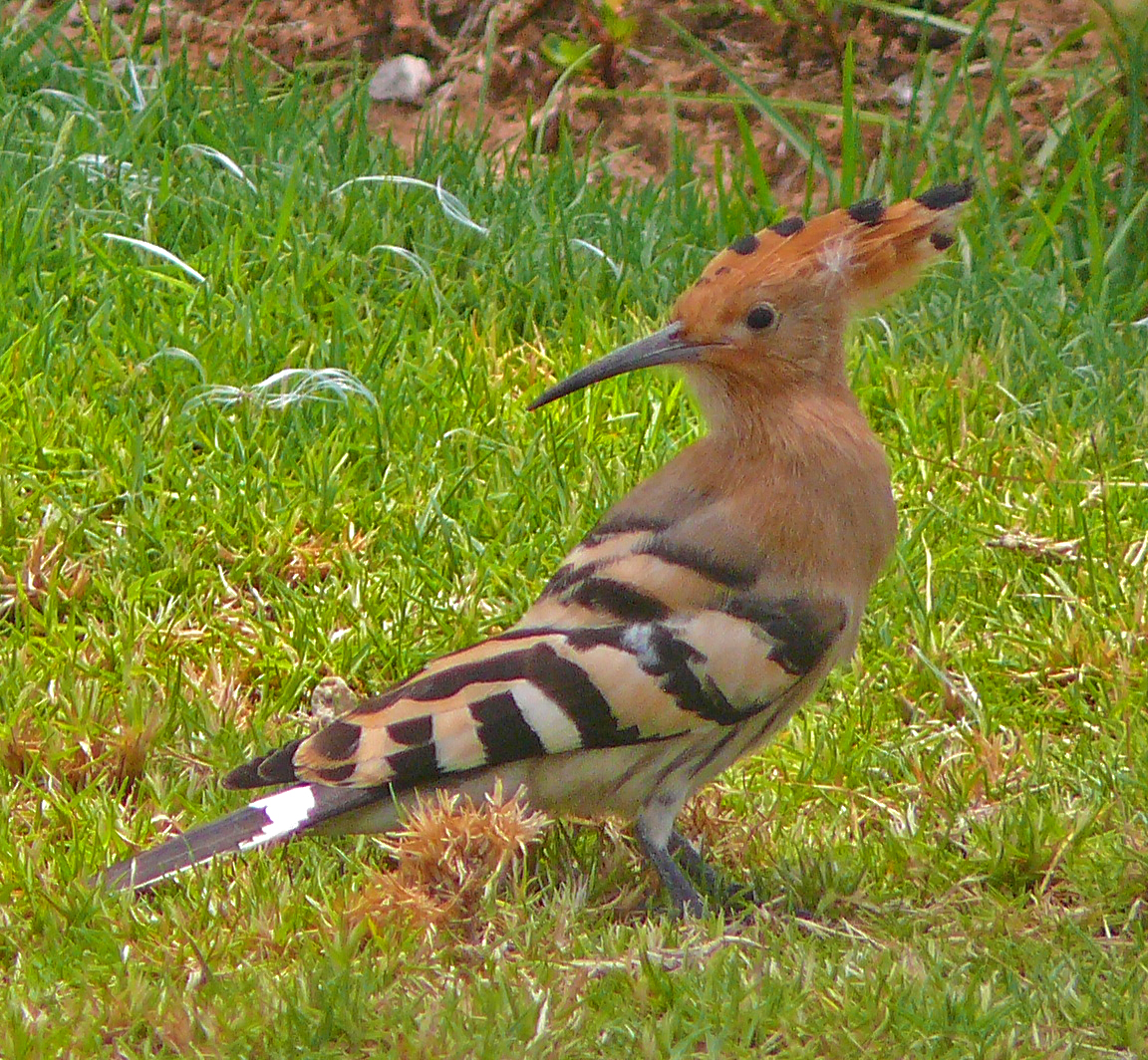
Eurasian hoopoe in Israel; crest lowered. The hoopoe is Israel's national bird.

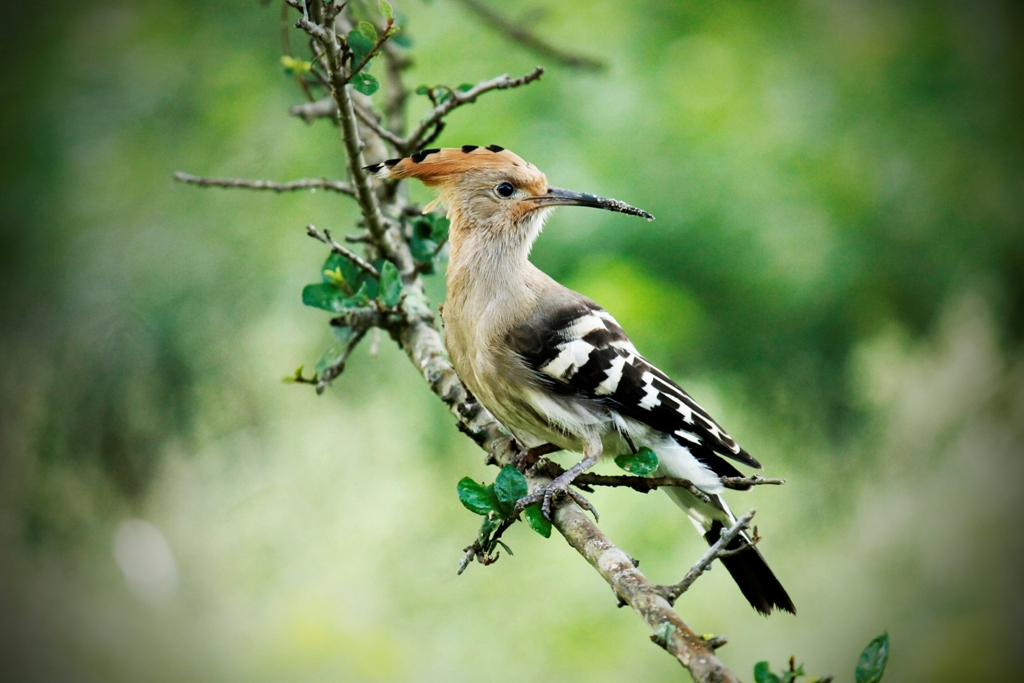
Hoopoe at Rajaji National Park, Uttarakhand, India

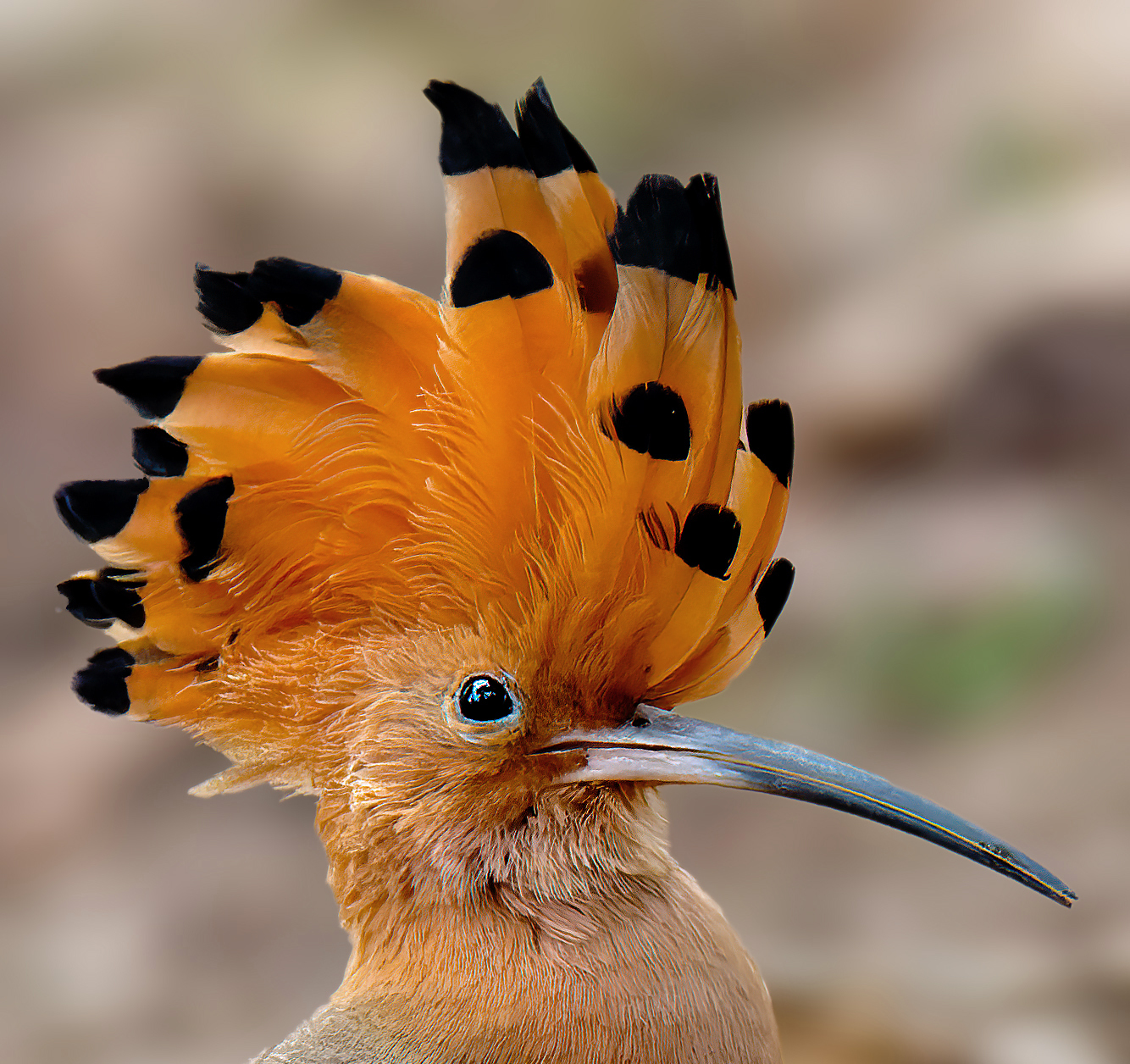
Hoopoe in Satchori National Park, Bangladesh

== Relationship with humans ==
The diet of the hoopoe includes many species considered by humans to be pests, such as the pupae of the processionary moth, a damaging forest pest which few other birds will eat because of its irritating hairs. For this reason, the species is afforded protection under the law in many countries.

=== In folklore, myth and religion ===
The hoopoe has a long presence in Near Eastern culture, folklore, mythology and religion. In Ancient Egypt, the hoopoe was used in the iconography as a symbolic code to indicate the child was the heir and successor of his father. It also had a symbolic standing in Minoan Crete.

There is both a Jewish Midrashic and Aggadah reference to the hoopoe bird, the Queen of Sheba and King Solomon. The hoopoe tells King Solomon that the Queen of Sheba is a sun worshipper. King Solomon then sends the hoopoe to Sheba, with a note attached to its wing, telling the queen that she must become his subject. She then sent him seagoing vessels, valuable gifts, and thousands of adolescents clothed in purple, who bring a missive saying that the queen will arrive in Jerusalem in three years, although it took her seven. The hoopoe is also mentioned in the Torah as unkosher, and therefore not edible. Additional legends state that the hoopoe hides riches in its nest. It was also believed to safeguard the shamir, a worm used by King Solomon to split the stones crucial for building the First Temple in Jerusalem.

The Hoopoe, known as the hudhud (هُدْهُد), also appears with King Solomon in the Quran in Surah 27 ٱلنَّمْل Al-Naml (The Ant):

27:20 ˹One day˺ he [Solomon] inspected the birds, and wondered, “Why is it that I cannot see the hoopoe? Or could he be absent?
27:21 I will surely subject him to a severe punishment, or ˹even˺ slaughter him, unless he brings me a compelling excuse.”
27:22 It was not long before the bird came and said, “I have found out something you do not know. I have just come to you from Sheba with sure news.
27:23 Indeed, I found a woman ruling over them, who has been given everything ˹she needs˺, and who has a magnificent throne.
27:24 I found her and her people prostrating to the sun instead of Allah. For Satan has made their deeds appealing to them—hindering them from the ˹Right˺ Way and leaving them unguided—

— Surah An-Naml 27:20-24

The connection of the hoopoe with Solomon and the Queen of Sheba in the Qur'anic tradition is mentioned in passing in Rudyard Kipling's Just So story "The Butterfly that Stamped".

In the pre-Islamic Vainakh religion of Chechnya, Ingushetia and Dagestan, the hoopoe was sacred to the goddess Tusholi and known as "Tusholi's hen". As her bird, it could be hunted only with the permission of the goddess's high priest for strictly medicinal purposes.

In Persia, hoopoes were seen as a symbol of virtue, and one was portrayed as a leader of the birds in the Persian book of poems The Conference of the Birds (Mantiq al-Tayr by Attar), though when the birds seek a king, the hoopoe points out that the Simurgh is the king of the birds.

Hoopoes were thought of as thieves across much of Europe, and harbingers of war in Scandinavia. In Estonian tradition, hoopoes are strongly connected with death and the underworld; their song is believed to foreshadow death for many people or cattle. In medieval ritual magic, the hoopoe was thought to be an evil bird. The Munich Manual of Demonic Magic, a collection of magical spells compiled in Germany frequently requires the sacrifice of a hoopoe to summon demons and perform other magical intentions.

Tereus, transformed into the hoopoe, is the king of the birds in the Ancient Greek comedy The Birds by Aristophanes. In Ovid's Metamorphoses, book 6, King Tereus of Thrace rapes Philomela, his wife Procne's sister, and cuts out her tongue. In revenge, Procne kills their son Itys and serves him as a stew to his father. When Tereus sees the boy's head, which is served on a platter, he grabs a sword but just as he attempts to kill the sisters, they are turned into birds—Procne into a swallow and Philomela into a nightingale. Tereus himself is turned into an epops (6.674), translated as lapwing by Dryden and lappewincke (lappewinge) by John Gower in his Confessio Amantis, or hoopoe in A.S. Kline's translation. The bird's crest indicates his royal status, and his long, sharp beak is a symbol of his violent nature. English translators and poets probably had the northern lapwing in mind, considering its crest.

=== As emblem ===
In Paleolithic artwork, from current southern Russia and Azerbaijan, the bird is presented as "the bird-sun." This is the earliest found symbolism of the hoopoe.

The Eurasian hoopoe was chosen as the national bird of Israel in May 2008 by a national survey of 155,000 citizens, which was organized by the Society for the Protection of Nature in Israel. The hoopoe appears on the logo of the University of Johannesburg and is the official mascot of the university's sports teams. The municipalities of Armstedt and Brechten, have a hoopoe in their coats of arms, as does Mārupe Municipality since 2021.

=== Use in folk medicine ===
In Morocco, hoopoes are traded live and as medicinal products in the markets, primarily in herbalist shops. This trade is unregulated and a potential threat to local populations.

In Manipur, one of the states comprising Northeast India, the hoopoe is still used by traditional Muslim healers in a variety of preparations believed locally to benefit a number of conditions both medical and spiritual. Manipur abuts upon Myanmar and has been a cultural crossroads and melting pot of cultures for over 2,500 years. Its traditional medicine may thus reflect influences from an unusually wide area, including not only the Indian subcontinent but also Central Asia, Southeast Asia, East Asia and even the further-flung regions of Siberia, the Arctic, Micronesia and Polynesia. Ibopishak and Bimola record four Manipuri folk medicinal uses of the hoopoe which specify neither the body part of the bird used nor its method of preparation:

- as a tranquilizer
- in the treatment of abdominal pain,
- in the treatment of kidney and bladder disorders
- in the "prevention of leprosy"

More specifically, it is believed that if an essence (method of preparation unspecified) prepared from the bird is dropped into the eye, it will remove superfluous eyelashes and strengthen the memory.

Furthermore, the authors record the following local Manipuri beliefs concerning specific body parts of the hoopoe:

- that its meat prevents frequent urination;
- that its feathers have the insecticidal property of killing ants and fleas
- that its blood banishes fairies (jinn) and nightmares
- that its heart cures (unspecified) diseases
- that its claws can be used to cure speech disorders.

While Ibopishak and Bimola are unable to find any discernible effect of hoopoe tissue alone upon the dissolution of kidney stones, they do note that their experiments reveal that hoopoe tissue potentiates the effects of the Manipuri medicinal plant Cissus javana, when employed to treat such calculi (local healers use bird and plant in just such a combination for this purpose). Since, however, there was no control used involving the tissues of any other bird species, it remains unclear whether there are any medicinal properties peculiar to hoopoe tissue deriving from a distinctive chemistry.

=== In popular culture ===
Harrison Tordoff, a World War II fighter ace and later a noted ornithologist, named his P-51 Mustang Upupa epops, the scientific name of the hoopoe bird.

A talking hoopoe named Almost Brilliant is a character in Nghi Vo's Singing Hills Cycle, first appearing in The Empress of Salt and Fortune.

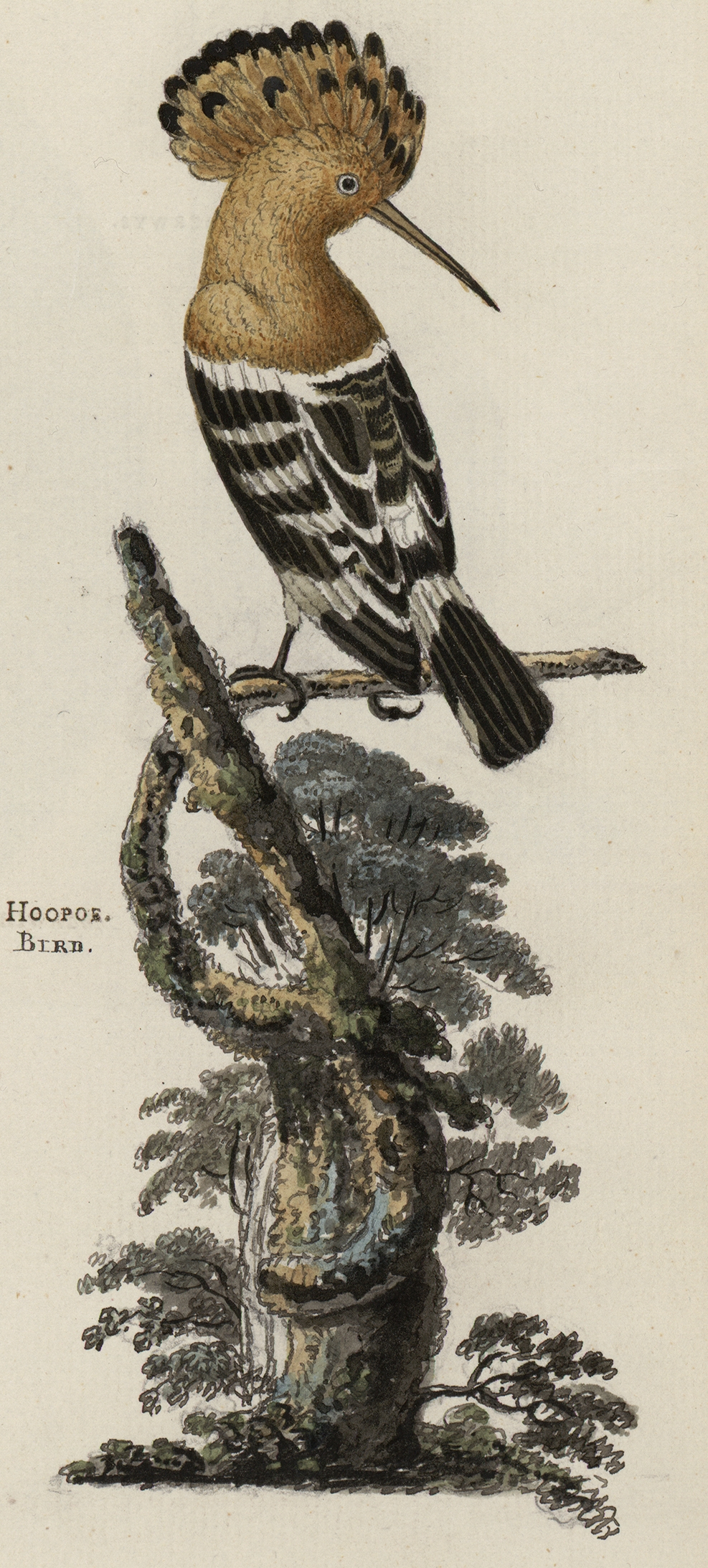
The hoopoe was recorded as residing in Britain in the 18th century.

Art originally from Naumann's Natural History of the Birds of Central Europe, 3rd ed. of 1905

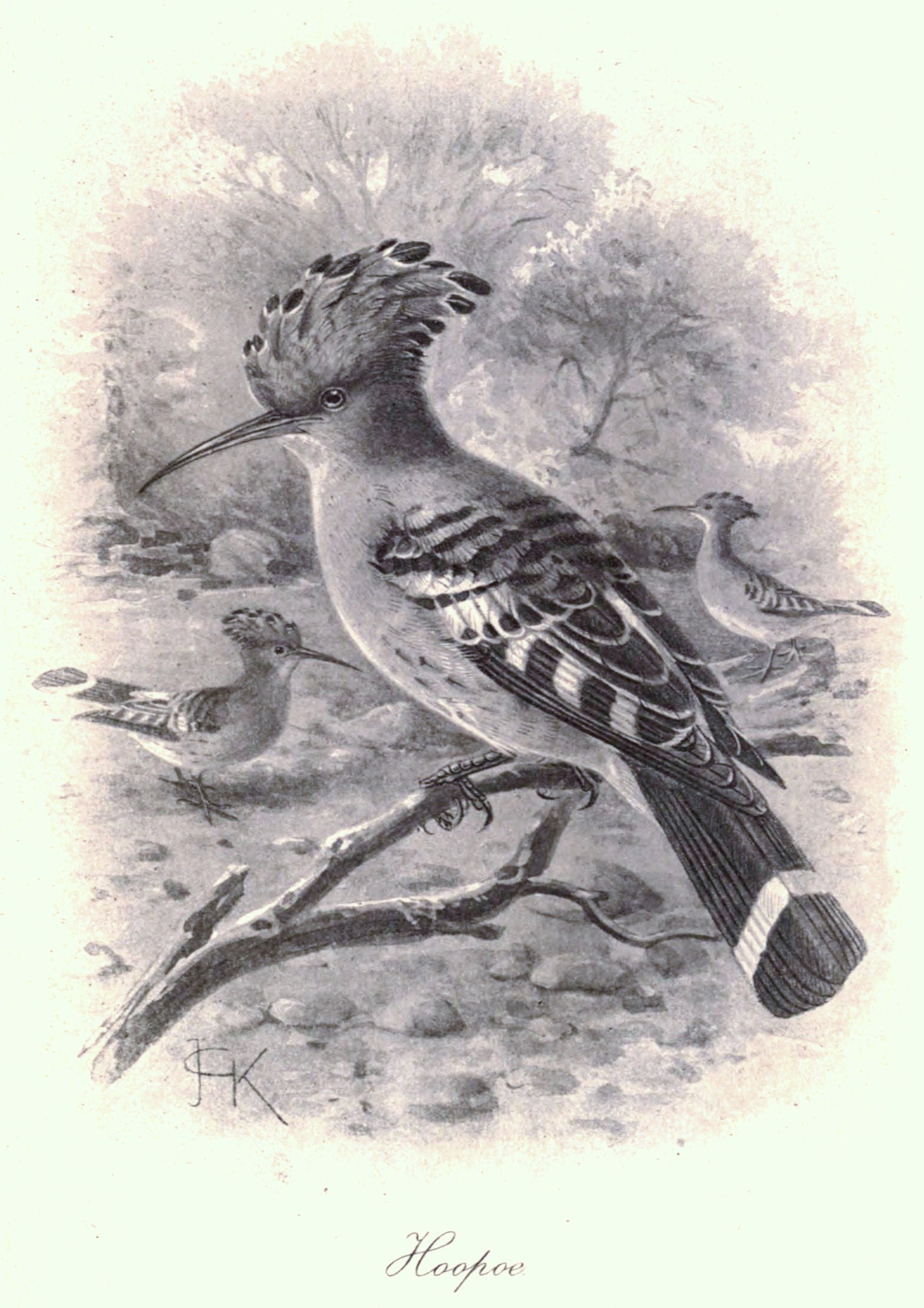
Hoopoe art c. 1900
