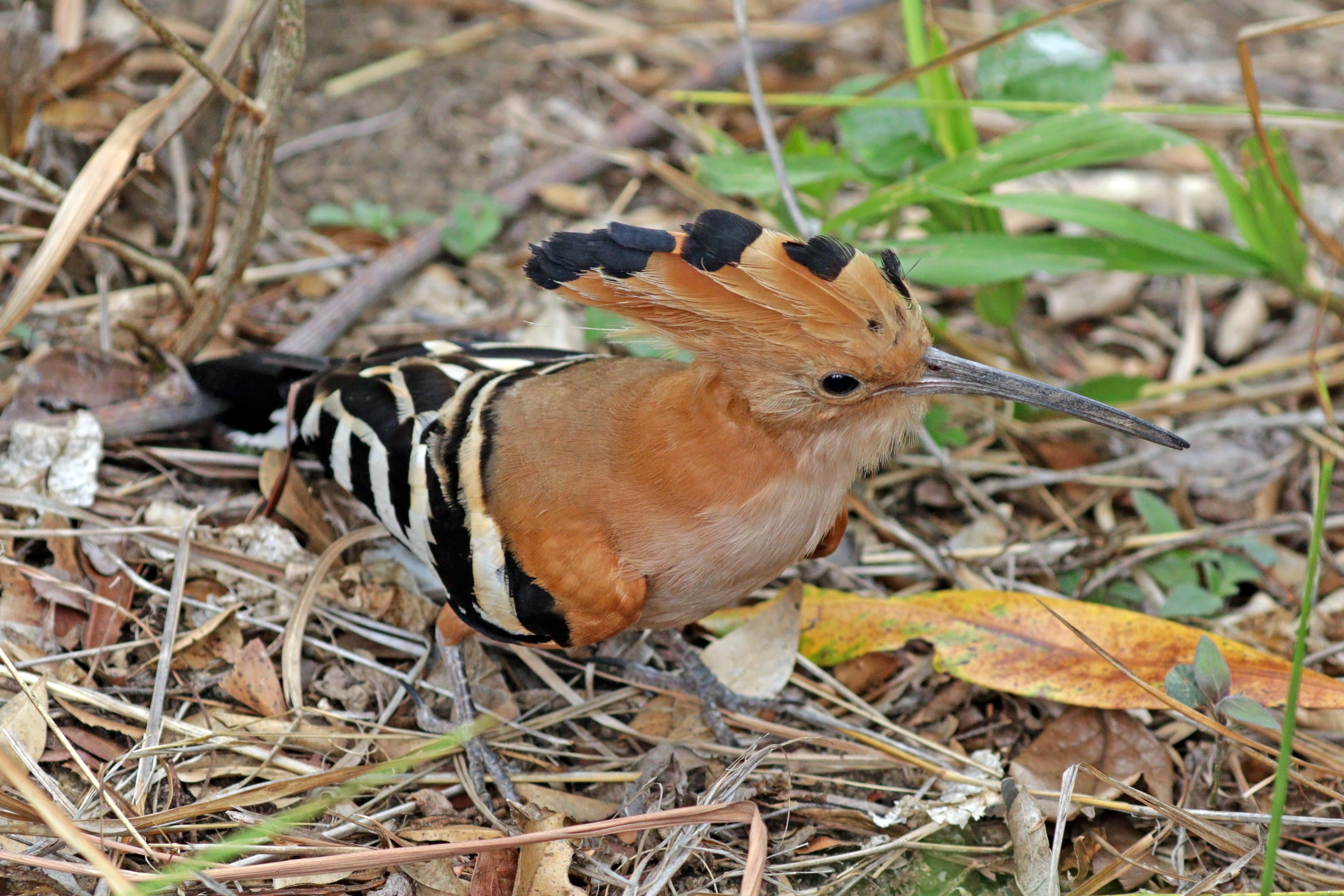
- Isalo National Park

Conservation status
- Least Concern (IUCN 3.1)

Scientific classification
- Kingdom: Animalia
- Phylum: Chordata
- Class: Aves
- Order: Bucerotiformes
- Family: Upupidae
- Genus: Upupa
- Species: U. marginata

Binomial name
- Upupa marginata Cabanis & Heine, 1860

Synonyms
- Upupa epops marginata

= Madagascar hoopoe =

Madagascan hoopoe

Species of bird endemic to Madagascar

The Madagascar hoopoe (Upupa marginata) is a species of hoopoe in the family Upupidae. It was previously considered a subspecies (Upupa epops marginata) of the hoopoe, but was split due to its vocalisations and small differences in plumage. Some taxonomists still consider all three species conspecific. Some authorities also keep the African and Eurasian hoopoe together, but split the Madagascar hoopoe. It is endemic to Madagascar, where its natural habitat is subtropical or tropical dry forest. It is a common bird and the International Union for Conservation of Nature considers its conservation status to be of least concern.

== Description ==
The adult Madagascar hoopoe is about 32 cm (12.6 in) long and weighs 57 to 91 g (2.0 to 3.2 oz). It has a long, decurved bill, and cinnamon-coloured plumage, the wings being boldly barred in black and white. The tail is black and a long, cinnamon crest with black-tipped feathers can be raised when the bird is alarmed. The wings are broad and rounded; the characteristic flight consists of a few beats after which the wings are folded momentarily and the bird glides, before resuming flapping. The female is slightly duller in colour than the male, with less white on the wings. Compared to the African hoopoe, it is larger, has a longer tail and a pinker throat. The song differs markedly from the African hoopoe's "hoop-hoop-hoop", being described as "a low cooing trill rrrrrrooow, dropping slightly, lasting 1.5–2.5 seconds, repeated every 3–10 seconds".

== Distribution and habitat ==
The Madagascar hoopoe is endemic to Madagascar where its range includes the north, west, central and southern parts of the country, while it is largely absent from the east. It inhabits the edges of forests, clearings, glades, savannah, pasture and brushland.

== Ecology ==
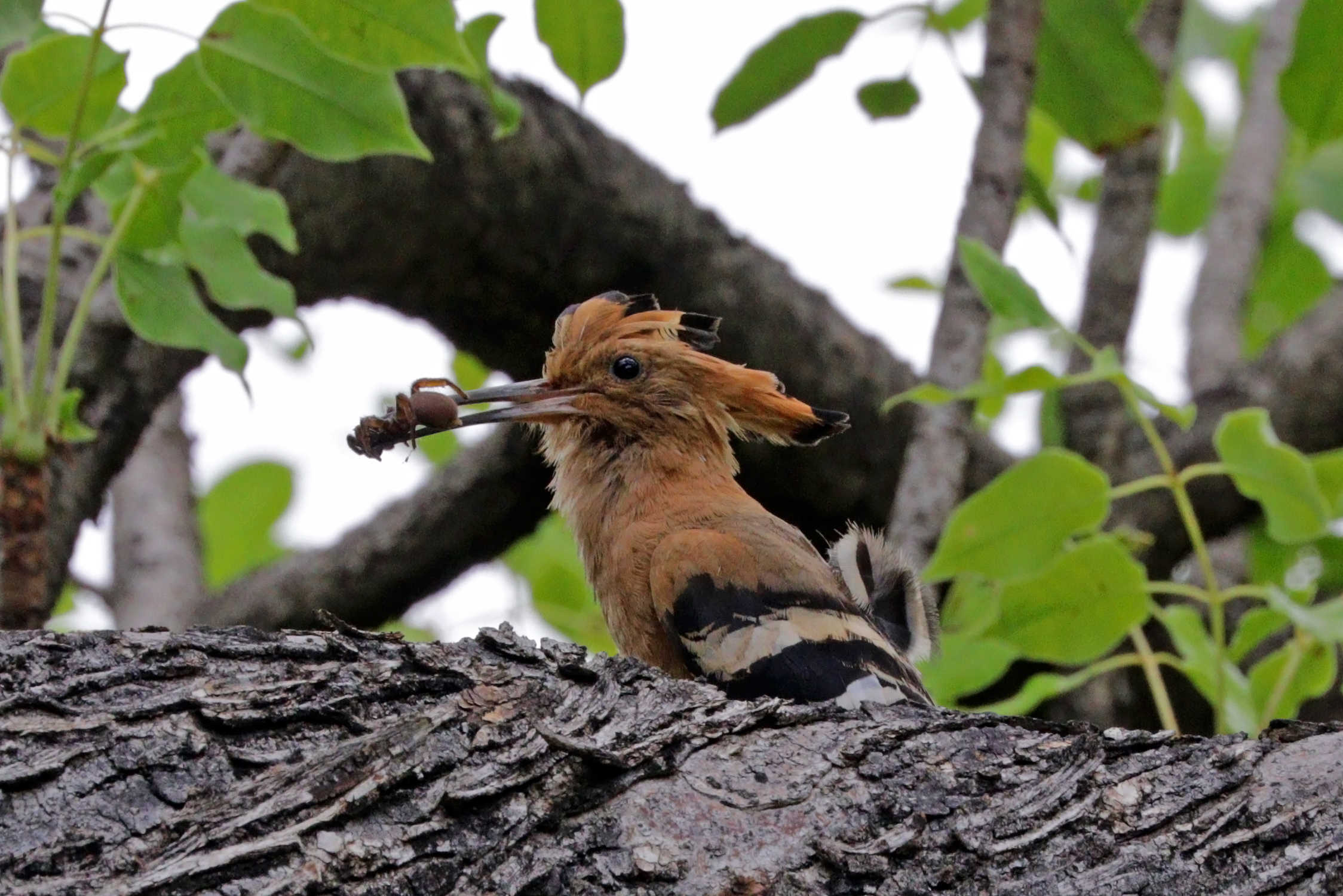
With spider for chick

The Madagascar hoopoe usually occurs alone or in pairs, foraging on the ground, walking a few steps and then looking around, bobbing its head, probing the soil and leaf litter with its beak, picking items off the surface of the ground, probing dung and investigating crevices. Its diet consists mainly of insects such as beetles and flies and their larvae, grasshoppers and caterpillars. When disturbed it may fly to a horizontal branch where it perches, flashing its wings and raising and lowering its crest.

This species is monogamous and territorial. Breeding takes place between August and December, mostly during October and November. The nest is in a deep cavity in a tree, often within 3 m (10 ft) of the ground. Little nesting material is used and the hole becomes messy and smelly before the young fledge. One nest had a clutch of six bluish-grey eggs. Incubation may possibly be done solely by the female, and the partner has been observed feeding the incubating bird. In other species of hoopoe, the incubation period is 15 to 16 days and the fledging period 26 to 32 days. Both parents are involved in feeding the young.
