= Solomon's hoopoe =

Avian messenger of Solomon in Islam

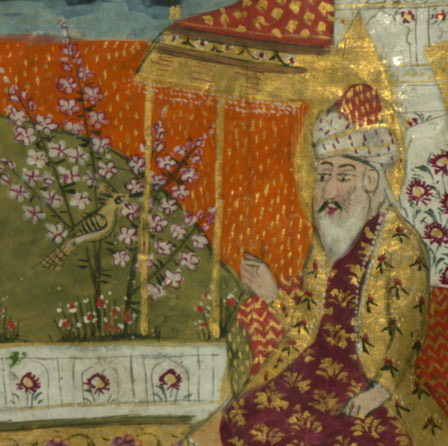
- Detail from King Solomon with the hoopoe who brought news from the Queen of Sheba, an Indian copy of an Islamic miniature, 1796.

Creature information
- Grouping: Bird
- Sub grouping: Hoopoe
- Folklore: Legend

Origin
- Region: Kingdom of Israel

Solomon's hoopoe, simply referred to as the hoopoe (Arabic: الهدهد, romanized: al-Hudʹhud; Turkish: Ibibik; Persian: هدهد; Urdu: ہوپو / ہد ہد), was the messenger of the Islamic prophet Solomon in a sequence of communications with the Queen of Sheba, according to the Quran. The bird has since emerged as a broader symbol of wisdom in Middle Eastern culture.

The hoopoe appears twice in the 27th chapter of An-Naml. The hoopoe, as described by the Quran, played an important role between Solomon and the Queen of Sheba while carrying messages between the two. In Shia tradition, Solomon's hoopoe is given the name Yaʽfūr, the same name as Muhammad's donkey.

In later Persian tradition, the hoopoe is honored for its wisdom in The Conference of the Birds, a Persian poem by Attar of Nishapur, as the natural "king of birds", though the hoopoe himself defers to the Simurg.

== Background ==
The hoopoe has a long presence in Near Eastern culture, folklore, mythology and religion. In Ancient Egypt, the hoopoe was used in the iconography as a symbolic code to indicate the child was the heir and successor of his father. It also had a symbolic standing in Minoan Crete.

In Iranian mythology, the hoopoe was originally a married woman who was encountered nude while combing her hair by her father-in-law. Such was her embarrassment that she took to the air as a bird with the comb still attached to her head. Thus, the bird became known in Persian language as "Şâne-ser" (scallop headed).

== Quranic narrative ==
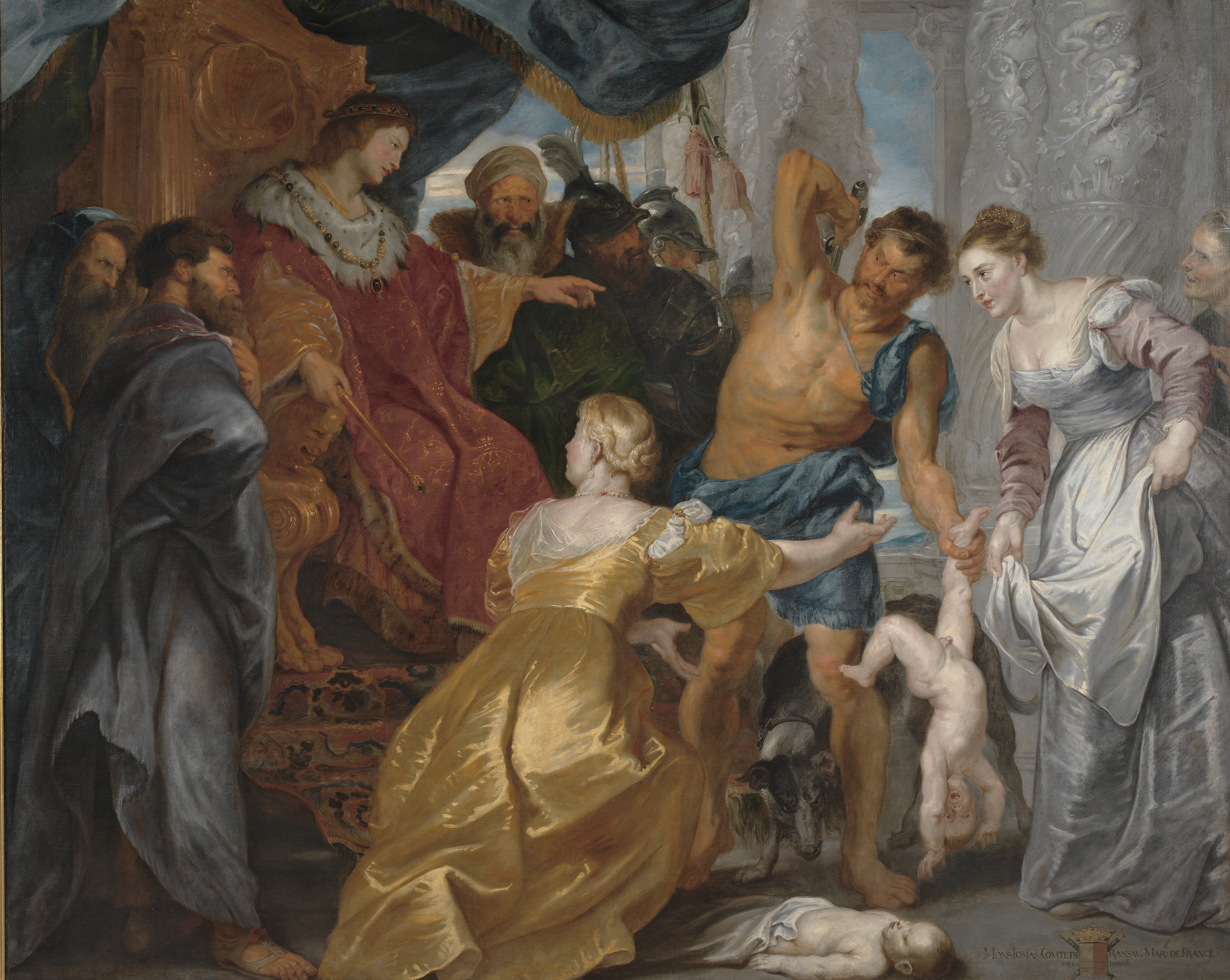
The Judgment of Solomon, 1617 by Peter Paul Rubens (1577–1640)

One day when Solomon took the roll call of the birds he discovered that the hudhud was missing.

Why do I not see hoopoe, or "is he among the absentees?" – either he brings me a valid proof or I will certainly punish or slaughter him severely for being absent.

Later when the bird arrived he described the situation before him for being away in the meeting.

I have discovered what you have not discovered, and I have arrived to you from the "Land of Sabah" where I found a wealthy woman with wonderful throne ruling over people An-Naml, Āyah (20–24)

As a pivotal role, the hoopoe also informed Solomon that the queen, along with her associates, worshipped the sun. Solomon subsequently wrote a letter and gave it to the bird for the queen to check the authenticity of what the bird said. The queen in return, sent gifts to him but he declined to accept them all. She later visited him, saw manifestation of Solomon, and adopted set of beliefs identified with religious conversion of Islam.

== Derived Islamic traditions ==
In Islamic literature, the main features of hoopoe were to collect the information and report it to Solomon. It is also suggested that the bird was primarily involved in dowsing such as locating underground water.

In Persian literature, the hudhud is honored for its wisdom in The Conference of the Birds, a Persian poem by Attar of Nishapur, as the natural "king of birds", though the hudhud himself defers to the Simurg.

In Turkish literature, the hoopoe is known as one of the sacred birds known as "Mürg-i Süleyman". The bird, according to Turkish philosophy, is given long silk on his head for his loyalty and compassion. Some mystic traditionalists credits the hoopoe with being able to bring about meaningful dreams.

== In popular culture ==
The connection of the hoopoe with Solomon and the Queen of Sheba in the Qur'anic tradition is mentioned in passing in Rudyard Kipling's Just So story "The Butterfly that Stamped".

A hoopoe appears in the music video "The Mountain, The Moon Cave and The Sad God" by the band Gorillaz.
