= Armstedt =

- Municipality
- Coat of arms

- Location of Armstedt within Segeberg district
- Interactive map of Armstedt
- Location within Germany Location within Schleswig-Holstein
- Coordinates: 53°58′N 9°51′E
- Country: Germany
- State: Schleswig-Holstein
- District: Segeberg
- Municipal assoc.: Bad Bramstedt-Land

Government
  - Mayor: Maren Horstmann

Area
  - Total: 8.92 km^{2} (3.44 sq mi)
- Elevation: 22 m (72 ft)

Population (2025-12-31)
  - Total: 391
  - Density: 43.8/km^{2} (114/sq mi)
- Time zone: UTC+01:00 (CET)
  - Summer (DST): UTC+02:00 (CEST)
- Postal codes: 24616
- Dialling codes: 04324
- Vehicle registration: SE
- Website: http://www.armstedt.de/

Armstedt is a municipality in the district of Segeberg, in Schleswig-Holstein, Germany.
