= Bilkisu =

- Gender: Female
- Language: Multiple

Origin
- Origin: Nigeria, from the Arabic بلقيس (Bilqis)

Other names
- Variant forms: Balkisu, Balikisu, Bilikisu

Bilkisu // is a feminine given name of Northern Nigerian origin. It is also used by Yoruba Muslims, who render it with an extra “i” (Bilikisu), because Yoruba phonetics does not allow consonant clusters. It is derived from بلقيس (Bilqis), the Arabic name for the Queen of Sheba. The uvular qāf (which Nigerian languages lack) is converted to a “k,” and a terminal vowel is added, typical of West African names. Among the Ijebu people of Ogun State, there is the legendary figure, Bilikisu Sungbo, a wealthy widow. Oral myths link her to the Solomonic narrative.

== Notable bearers ==
- Bilkisu Funtuwa, Nigerian author
- Bilkisu Yusuf (1952–2015), Nigerian journalist
- Bilkisu Yusuf (judoka) (born 1977), Nigerian judoka
