= Belkis =

Belkis, Belkıs and Belkız (as well as other variants) are feminine given names in Latin America and the Middle East, derived from Belqis, the Arabic given name of the Queen of Sheba; and it may refer to:

- Belkis Ayón (1967–1999), Cuban artist
- Belkis Cuza Malé (born 1942), Cuban-American writer
- Belkis Leal (born 1940), Venezuelan fencer
- Belkis Florentina Izquierdo Torres, Colombian judge
- Belkis Rodríguez (born 1965), Cuban retired tennis player
- Belkis Ulacio, Venezuelan politician
- Belkis, Regina di Saba, a ballet about the Queen of Sheba composed by Ottorino Respighi
- Belkıs Akkale (born 1956), Turkish singer
- Belkıs Sevket, first Turkish woman to fly
- Belkis Valdman (1942-2011) Turkish born naturalised Brazilian researcher, teacher and academic chemical engineer.
- Belkıs Zehra Kaya (born 1984), Turkish judoka

== See also ==
- Belcalis
