= Queen of Sheba =

Historical figure in the Abrahamic religions

- מַלְכַּת שְׁבָא (Hebrew) ملكة سبأ (Arabic) ንግሥተ ሳባ (Geʽez)
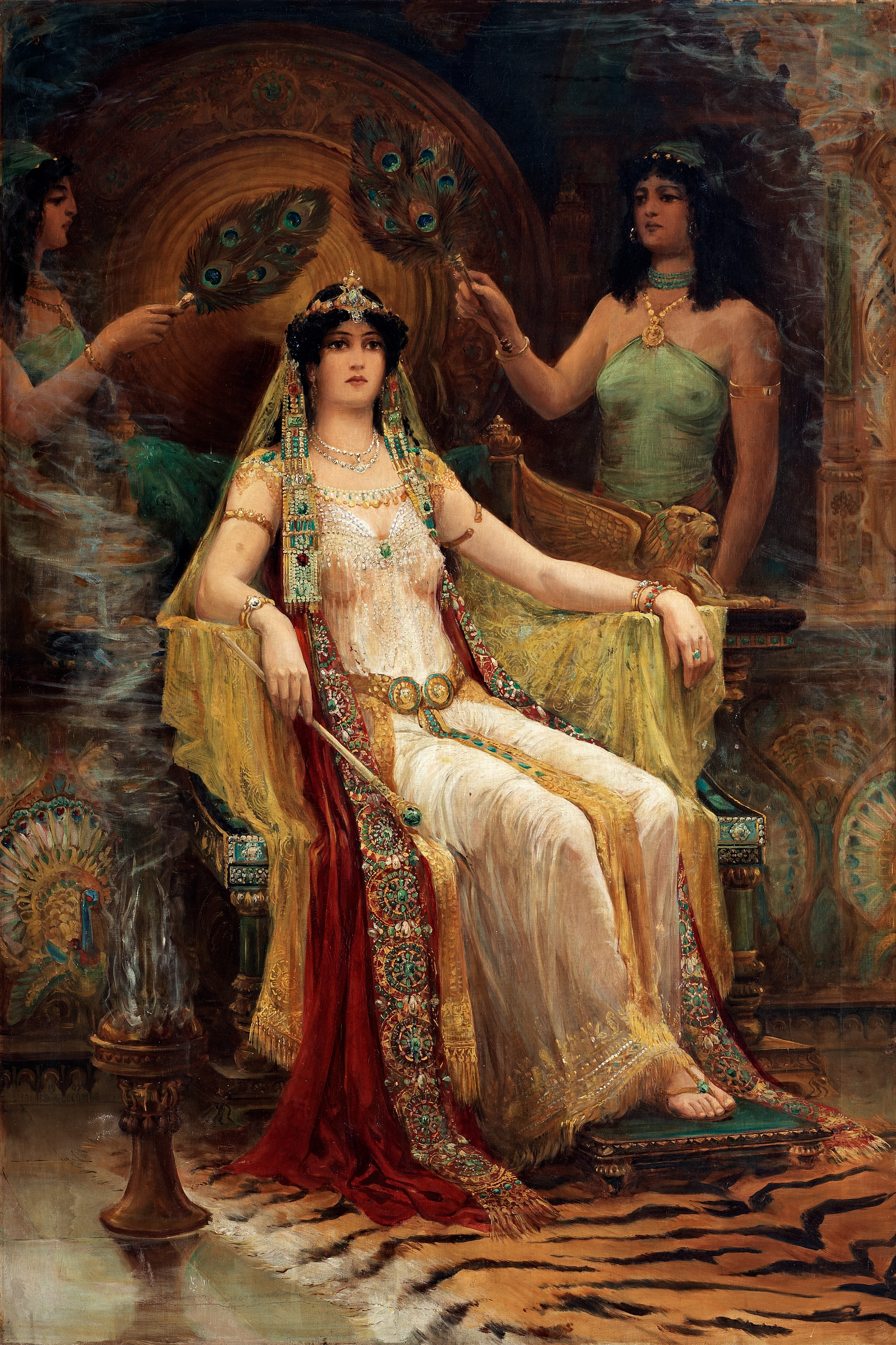
- Queen of Sheba by Edward Slocombe, 1907

Personal life
- Region: Kingdom of Sheba
- Other names: Bilqis (بلقيس); Makeda (ማክዳ)

Religious life
- Religion: Unattested (possibly Arabian polytheism)

The Queen of Sheba, (Note: Hebrew: מַלְכַּת שְׁבָא, romanized: Malkaṯ Səḇāʾ; Arabic: ملكة سبأ, romanized: Malikat Sabaʾ; Ge'ez: ንግሥተ ሳባ, romanized: Nəgśətä Saba) named Bilqis (Note: Arabic: بلقيس, romanized: Balqīs) in Arabic and Makeda (Note: Ge'ez: ማክዳ, romanized: Makəda) in Geʽez, is a figure first mentioned in the Hebrew Bible. In the original story, she brings a caravan of valuable gifts for Solomon, the fourth King of Israel and Judah. This account has undergone extensive elaborations in Judaism, Ethiopian Christianity, and Islam. It has consequently become the subject of one of the most widespread and fertile cycles of legends in West Asia and Northeast Africa, as well as in other regions where the Abrahamic religions have had a significant impact.

Modern historians and archaeologists identify Sheba as one of the South Arabian kingdoms, which existed in modern-day Yemen. However, because no trace of her has ever been found, the Queen of Sheba's existence is disputed among historians.

== Narrative ==
=== Hebrew ===
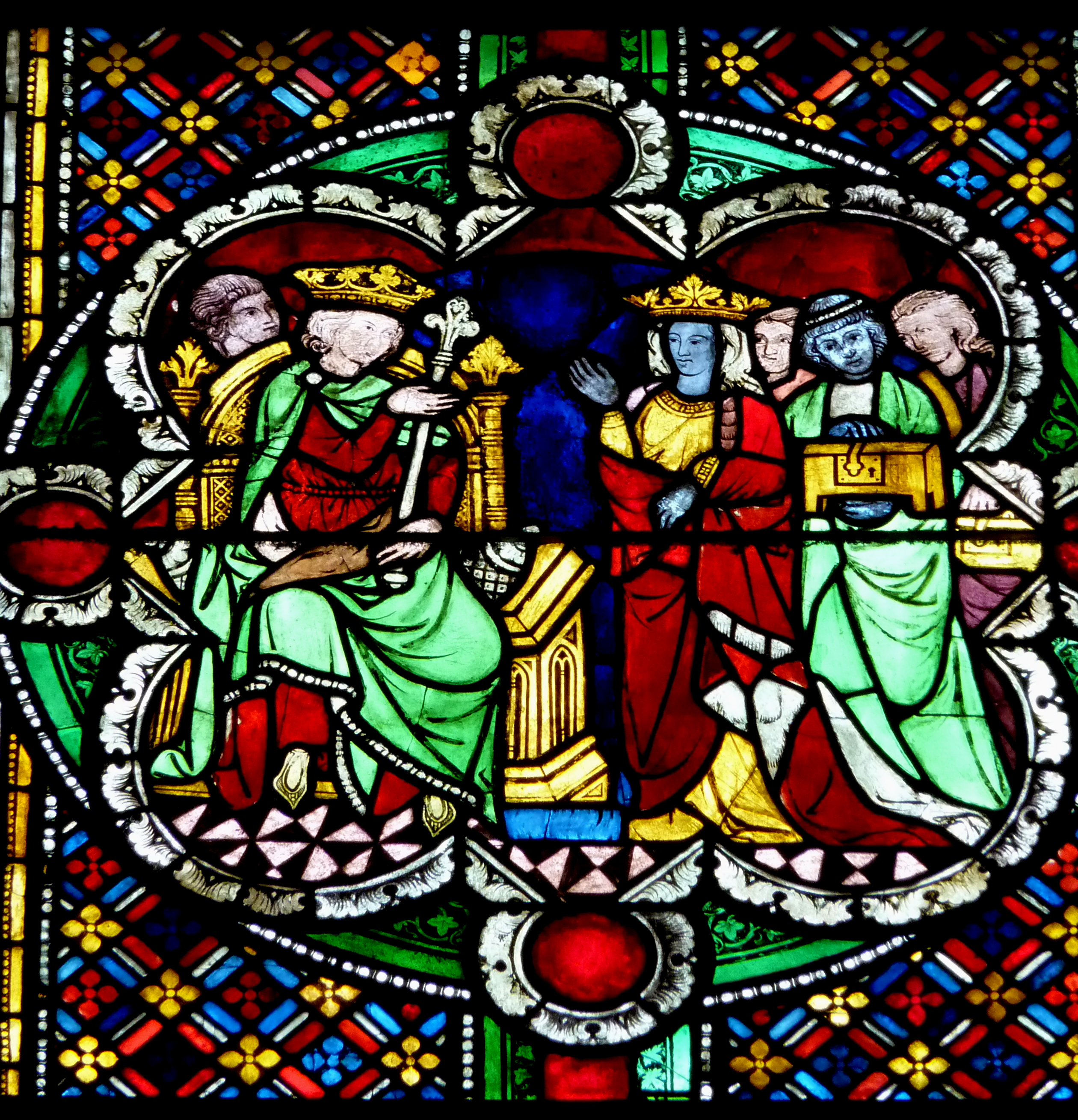
Queen of Sheba and Solomon, around 1280, window now in Cologne Cathedral, Germany

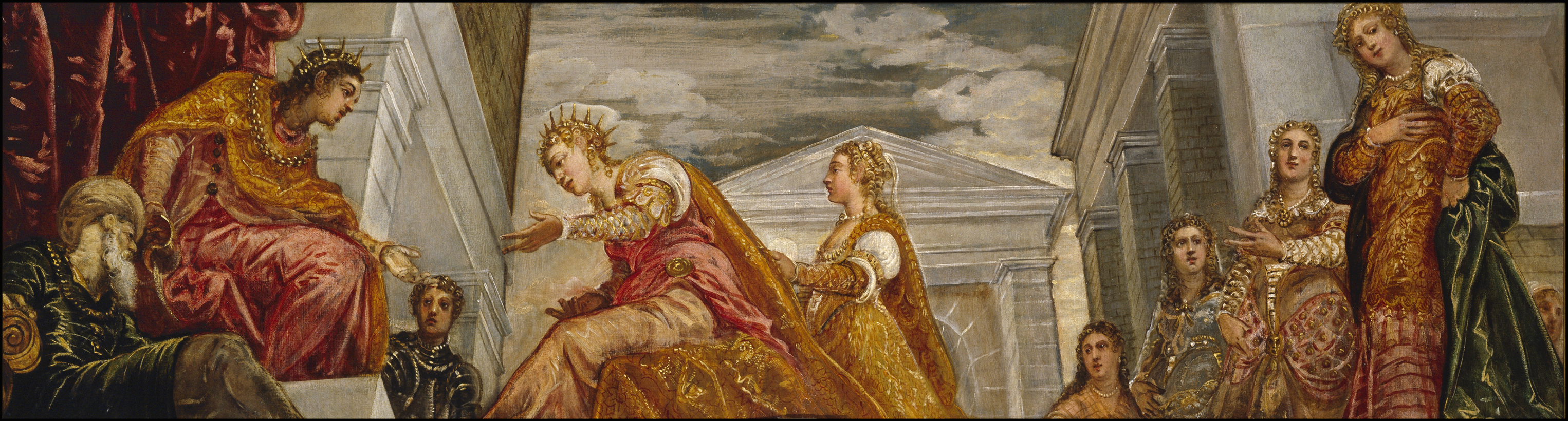
The Queen of Sheba's visit to Solomon by Tintoretto, around 1555

The Queen of Sheba (Hebrew: מַלְכַּת שְׁבָא, romanized: Malkaṯ Šəḇāʾ, in the Hebrew Bible; Koine Greek: βασίλισσα Σαβά, romanized: basílissa Sabá, in the Septuagint; Syriac: ܡܠܟܬ ܫܒܐ, romanized: Malkat Šəḇāʾ; Ge'ez: ንግሥተ ሳባ, romanized: Nəgśətä Saba), whose name is not stated, came to Jerusalem "with a very great retinue, with camels bearing spices, and very much gold, and precious stones" (1 Kings 10:2). "Never again came such an abundance of spices" (10:10; 2 Chronicles 9:1–9) as those she gave to Solomon.

The use of the term ḥiddot or 'riddles' (1 Kings 10:1), an Aramaic loanword, indicates a late origin for the text.

Sheba was quite well known in the classical world. Sheba and Seba are differentiated at some points in the Bible, but not in indigenous inscriptions.

=== Arabic ===
Although there are still no inscriptions found from South Arabia that furnish evidence for the Queen of Sheba herself, South Arabian inscriptions do mention a South Arabian queen (mlkt, Ancient South Arabian: 𐩣𐩡𐩫𐩩). And in the north of Arabia, Assyrian inscriptions repeatedly mention Arab queens.

The queen's visit could have been a trade mission. A recent theory suggests that the Ophel inscription in Jerusalem was written in the Sabaic language and that the text provides evidence for trade connections between ancient South Arabia and the Kingdom of Judah during the 10th century BC.

The ancient Sabaic Awwām Temple, known in folklore as Maḥram ("the Sanctuary of") Bilqīs, was excavated by archaeologists; no evidence was found relating to the Queen of Sheba. Another Sabean temple, the Barran Temple (Arabic: معبد بران), is also known as the 'Arash Bilqis' ("Throne of Bilqis"), which like the nearby Awwam Temple was also dedicated to the god Almaqah, but the connection between the Barran Temple and Sheba has not been established archaeologically either.

Bible stories of the Queen of Sheba and the ships of Ophir served as a basis for legends about the Israelites traveling in the Queen of Sheba's entourage when she returned to her country to bring up her child by Solomon.

== Religious interpretations ==
=== In Judaism ===
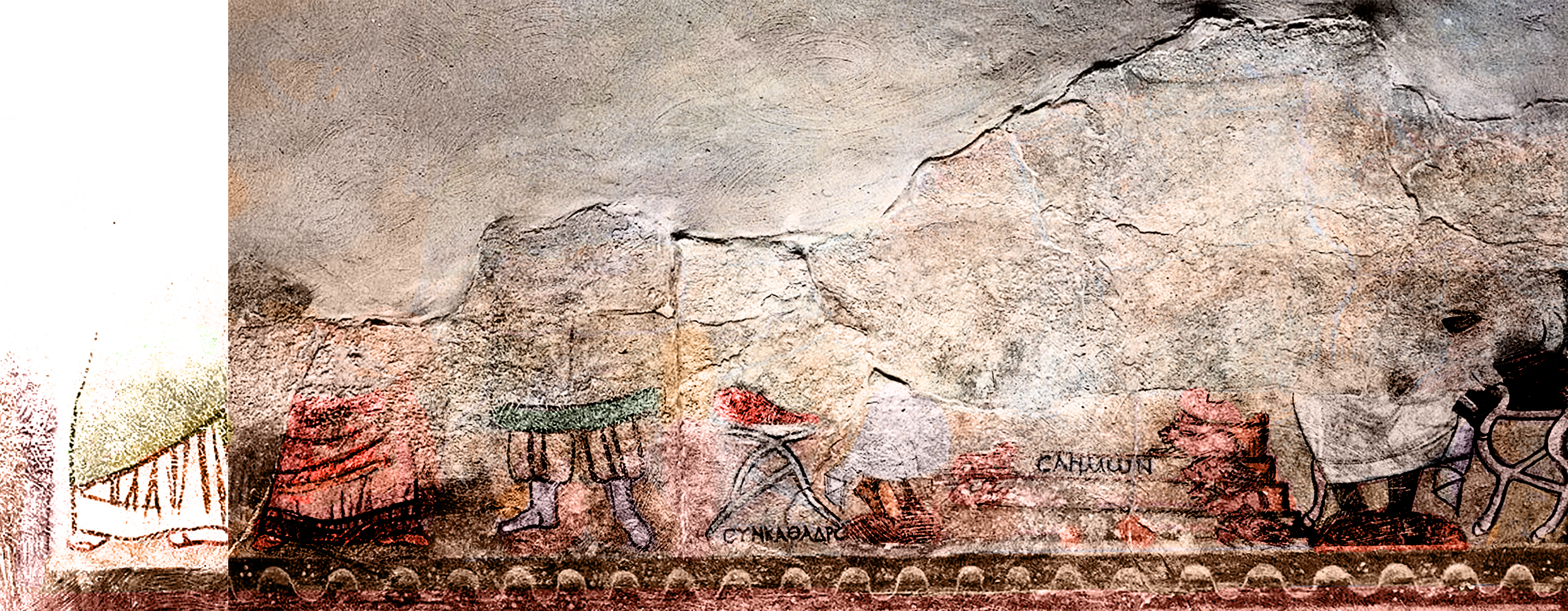
245–246 CE Jewish mural depicting Solomon's court and one labeled "co-chair" receiving the Queen of Sheba and her maidservant from the Dura Europos Synagogue

According to Josephus (Ant. 8:165–173), the queen of Sheba was the queen of Egypt and Ethiopia, and brought to Israel the first specimens of the balsam, which grew in the Holy Land in the historian's time. Josephus (Antiquities 2.5‒10) represents Cambyses as conquering the capital of Aethiopia, and changing its name from Seba to Meroe. Josephus affirms that the Queen of Sheba or Saba came from this region, and that it bore the name of Saba before it was known by that of Meroe. There seems also some affinity between the word Saba and the name or title of the kings of the Aethiopians, Sabaco.

The Talmud (Bava Batra 15b) says: "Whoever says malkath Sheba (I Kings X, 1) means a woman is mistaken; ... it means the kingdom (מַלְכֻת) of Sheba".

A Yemenite manuscript entitled "Midrash ha-Hefez" (published by S. Schechter in Folk-Lore, 1890, pp. 353 et seq.) gives nineteen riddles, most of which are found scattered through the Talmud and the Midrash, which the author of the "Midrash ha-Hefez" attributes to the Queen of Sheba. Most of these riddles are simply Bible questions, some not of a very edifying character. The two that are genuine riddles are: "Without movement while living, it moves when its head is cut off", and "Produced from the ground, man produces it, while its food is the fruit of the ground". The answer to the former is, "a tree, which, when its top is removed, can be made into a moving ship"; the answer to the latter is, "a wick".

The rabbis who denounce Solomon interpret 1 Kings 10:13 as meaning that Solomon had criminal intercourse with the Queen of Sheba, the offspring of which was Nebuchadnezzar, who destroyed the Temple (comp. Rashi ad loc.). According to others, the sin ascribed to Solomon in 1 Kings 11:7 et seq. is only figurative: it is not meant that Solomon fell into idolatry, but that he was guilty of failing to restrain his wives from idolatrous practises (Shab. 56b).

=== Christianity ===
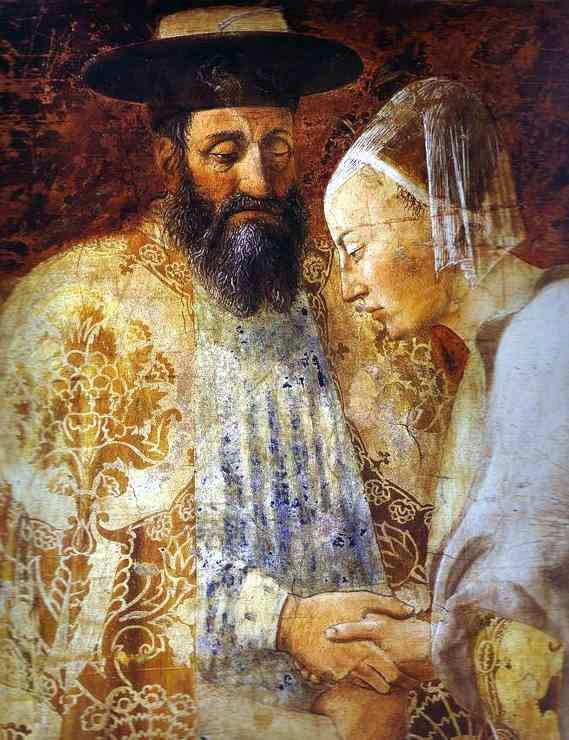
King Solomon and the Queen of Sheba, from The History of the True Cross by Piero della Francesca

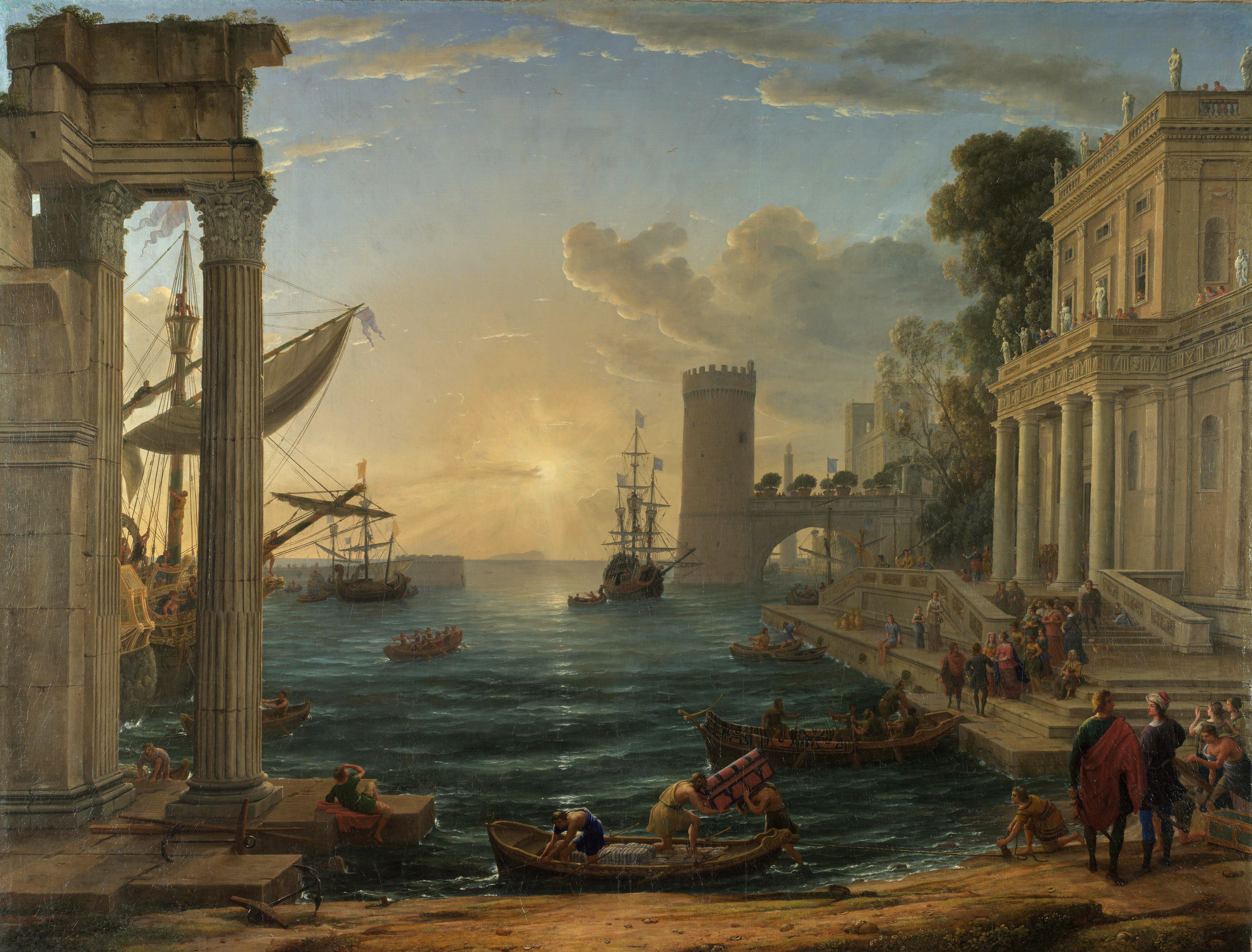
The Embarkation of the Queen of Sheba, Claude Lorrain (1600‒1682), oil on canvas

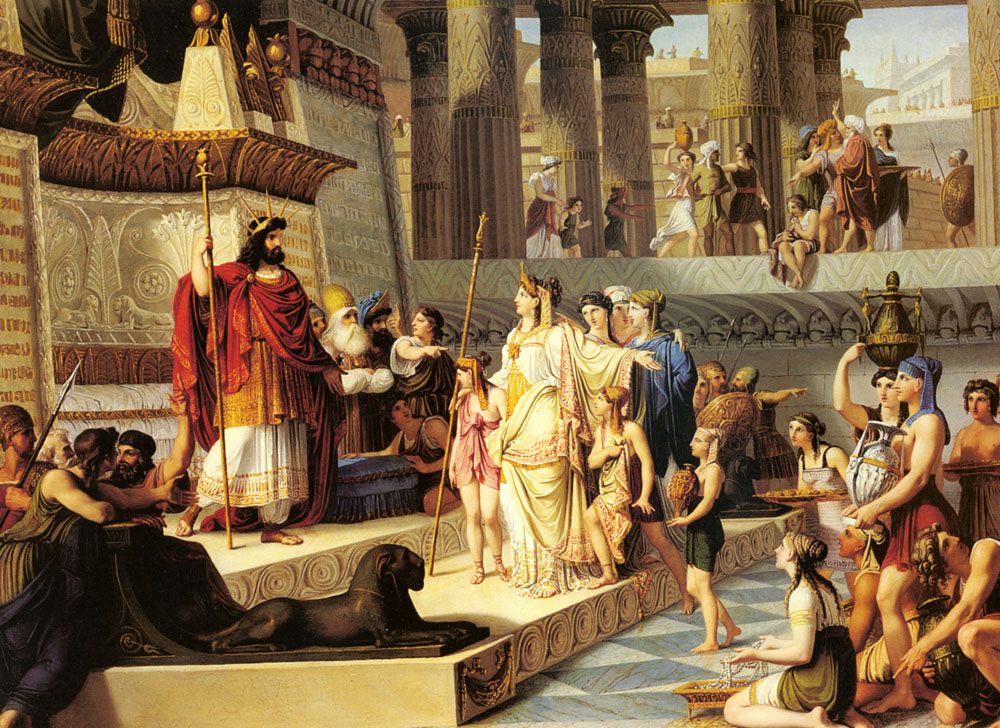
Solomon and The Queen of Sheba, Giovanni De Min

The New Testament mentions a "queen of the South" (Greek: βασίλισσα νότου, Latin: Regina austri), who "came from the uttermost parts of the earth", i.e. from the extremities of the then known world, to hear the wisdom of Solomon (Mt. 12:42; Lk. 11:31).

The mystical interpretation of the Song of Songs, which was felt as supplying a literal basis for the speculations of the allegorists, makes its first appearance in Origen, who wrote a voluminous commentary on the Song of Songs. Others have proposed either the marriage of Solomon with the Pharaoh's daughter, or his marriage with an Israelite woman, the Shulamite. The former was the favorite opinion of the mystical interpreters to the end of the 18th century; the latter has obtained since its introduction by Good (1803).

The bride of the Canticles is assumed to have been black due to a passage in Song of Songs 1:5, which the Revised Standard Version (1952) translates as "I am very dark, but comely", as does Jerome (Latin: Nigra sum, sed formosa), while the New Revised Standard Version (1989) has "I am black and beautiful", as the Septuagint (Ancient Greek: μέλαινα εἰμί καί καλή).

One legend has it that the Queen of Sheba brought Solomon the same gifts that the Magi later gave to Jesus. During the Middle Ages, Christians sometimes identified the queen of Sheba with the sibyl Sabba.

==== Ethiopian ====
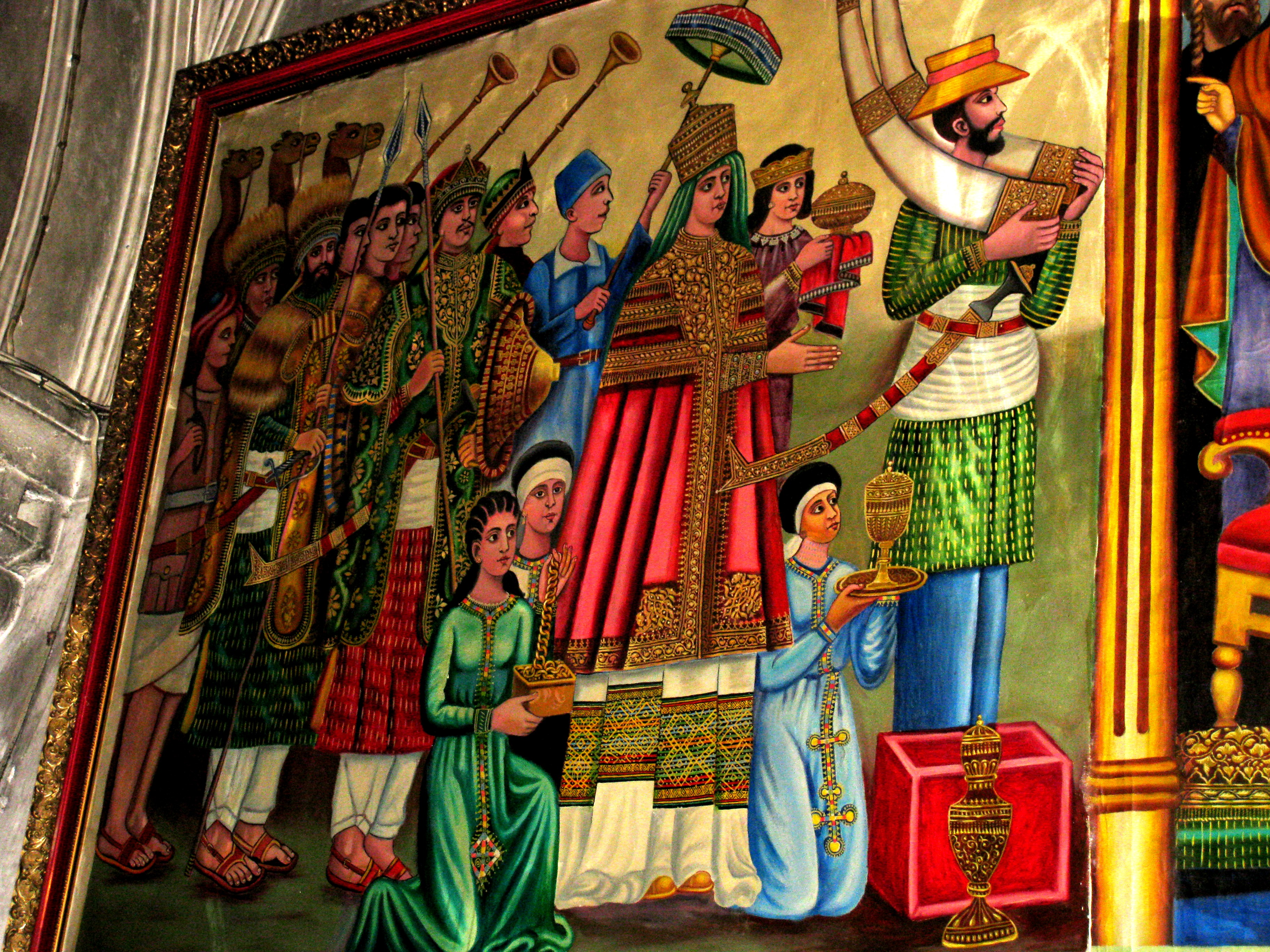
Solomon receiving the Queen of Sheba (detail), Chapel of the Four Living Creatures (disputed between the Copts and Ethiopians) in the Church of the Holy Sepulchre

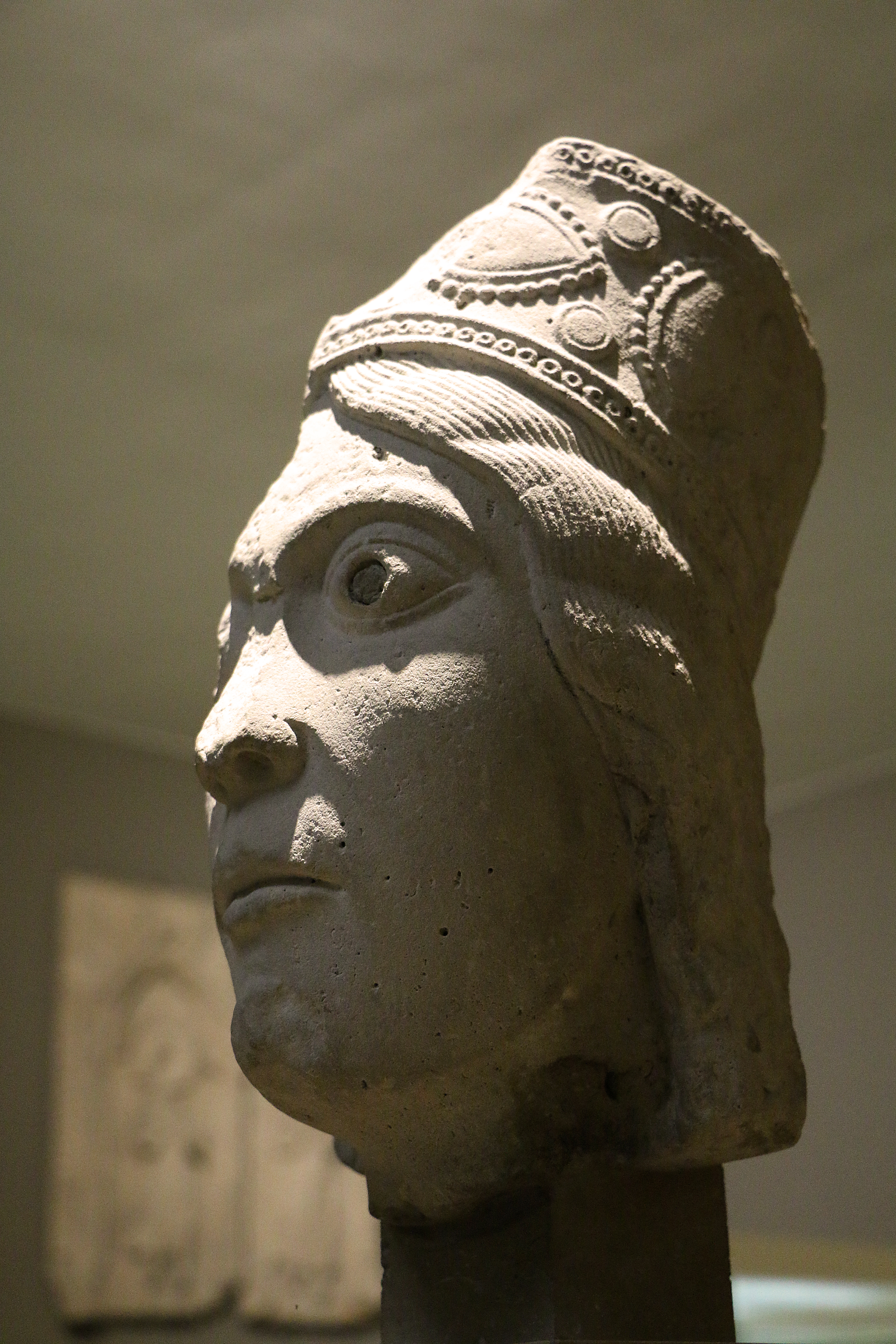
Part of the head of the Queen of Sheba from the Abbey of Saint Denis - XIIth century

The most extensive version of the legend appears in the Kebra Nagast (Glory of the Kings), the Ethiopian national saga, translated from Arabic in 1322. Here Menelik I is the child of Solomon and Makeda (the Ethiopic name for the queen of Sheba; she is the child of the man who destroys the legendary snake-king Arwe) from whom the Ethiopian dynasty claims descent to the present day.

Based on the Gospels of Matthew (12:42) and Luke (11:31), the "queen of the South" is claimed to be the queen of Ethiopia. In those times, King Solomon sought merchants from all over the world, in order to buy materials for the building of the Temple. Among them was Tamrin, great merchant of Queen Makeda of Ethiopia. Having returned to Ethiopia, Tamrin told the queen of the wonderful things he had seen in Jerusalem, and of Solomon's wisdom and generosity, whereupon she decided to visit Solomon. She was warmly welcomed, given a palace for dwelling, and received great gifts every day. Solomon and Makeda spoke with great wisdom, and instructed by him, she converted to Judaism. Before she left, there was a great feast in the king's palace. Makeda stayed in the palace overnight, after Salomon had sworn that he would not do her any harm, while she swore in return that she would not steal from him. As the meals had been spicy, Makeda awoke thirsty at night, and went to drink some water, when Solomon appeared, reminding her of her oath. She answered: "Ignore your oath, just let me drink water." That same night, Solomon had a dream about the sun rising over Israel, but being mistreated and despised by the Jews, the sun moved to shine over Ethiopia and Rome (i. e. the Byzantine empire). Solomon gave Makeda a ring as a token of faith, and then she left. On her way home, she gave birth to a son, whom she named Baina-leḥkem (i. e. bin al-ḥakīm, "Son of the Wise", later called Menilek). After the boy had grown up in Ethiopia, he went to Jerusalem carrying the ring, and was received with great honors. The king and the people tried in vain to persuade him to stay. Solomon gathered his nobles and announced that he would send his first-born son to Ethiopia together with their first-borns. He added that he was expecting a third son, who would marry the king of Rome's daughter and reign over Rome, so that the entire world would be ruled by David's descendants. Then Baina-leḥkem was anointed king by Zadok the high priest, and he took the name David. The first-born nobles who followed him are named, and even today some Ethiopian families claim their ancestry from them. Prior to leaving, the priests' sons had stolen the Ark of the Covenant, after their leader Azaryas had offered a sacrifice as commanded by one God's angel. With much wailing, the procession left Jerusalem on a wind cart led and carried by the archangel Michael. Having arrived at the Red Sea, Azaryas revealed to the people that the Ark is with them. David prayed to the Ark and the people rejoiced, singing, dancing, blowing horns and flutes, and beating drums. The Ark showed its miraculous powers during the crossing of the stormy Sea, and all arrived unscathed. When Solomon learned that the Ark had been stolen, he sent a horseman after the thieves, and even gave chase himself, but neither could catch them. Solomon returned to Jerusalem, and gave orders to the priests to remain silent about the theft and to place a copy of the Ark in the Temple, so that the foreign nations could not say that Israel had lost its fame.

The 1922 regnal list of Ethiopia claims that Makeda reigned from 1013 to 982 BC, with dates following the Ethiopian calendar.

In the Ethiopian Book of Aksum, Makeda is described as establishing a new capital city at Azeba.

Edward Ullendorff holds that Makeda is a corruption of Candace, the name or title of several Ethiopian queens from Meroe or Seba. Candace was the name of that queen of the Ethiopians whose chamberlain was converted to Christianity under the preaching of Philip the Evangelist (Acts 8:27) in 30 AD. In the 14th-century (?) Ethiopic version of the Alexander romance, Alexander the Great of Macedonia (Ethiopic Meqédon) is said to have met a queen Kandake of Nubia. The tradition that the biblical Queen of Sheba was an indigenous ruler of Ethiopia who visited King Solomon in Jerusalem is repeated in a 1st-century account by Josephus. He identified Solomon's visitor as a queen of Egypt and Ethiopia.

According to one tradition, the Ethiopian Jews (Beta Israel, "Falashas") also trace their ancestry to Menelik I, son of King Solomon and the Queen of Sheba. An opinion that appears more historical is that the Falashas descend from those Jews who settled in Egypt after the first exile, and who, upon the fall of the Persian domination (539–333 BC), on the borders of the Nile, penetrated into the Sudan, whence they went into the western parts of Abyssinia.

Several emperors have stressed the importance of the Kebra Negast. One of the first instances of this can be traced in a letter from Prince Kasa (King John IV) to Queen Victoria in 1872. Kasa states, "There is a book called Kebra Nagast which contains the law of the whole of Ethiopia, and the names of the shums (governors), churches and provinces are in this book. I pray you will find out who has got this book and send it to me, for in my country my people will not obey my orders without it." Despite the historic importance given to the Kebra Negast, there is still doubt to whether or not the Queen sat on the throne.

=== Islam ===
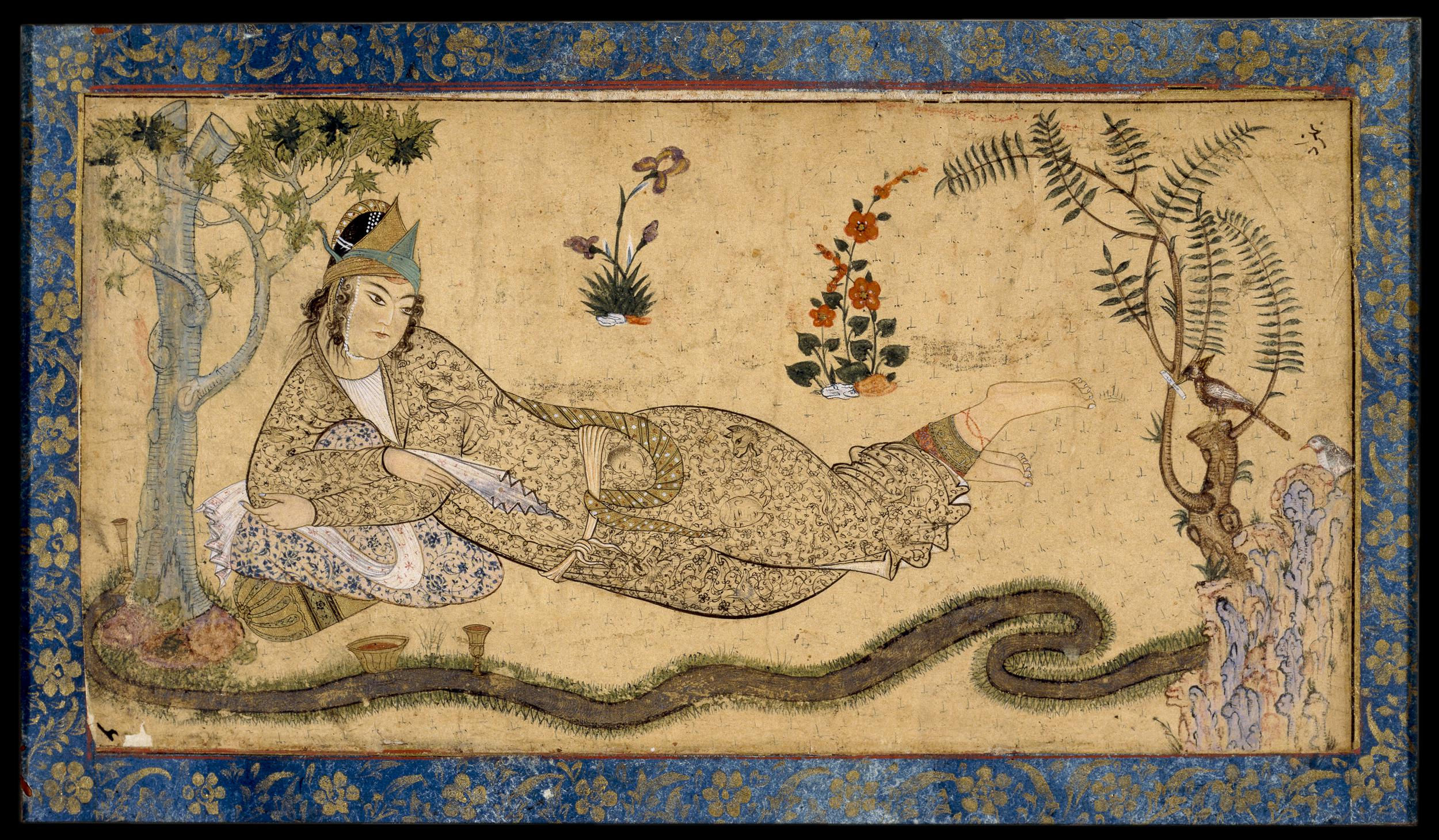
Bilqis (the queen of Sheba) reclining in a garden, facing the hoopoe, Solomon's messenger. Persian miniature (c. 1595), tinted drawing on paper

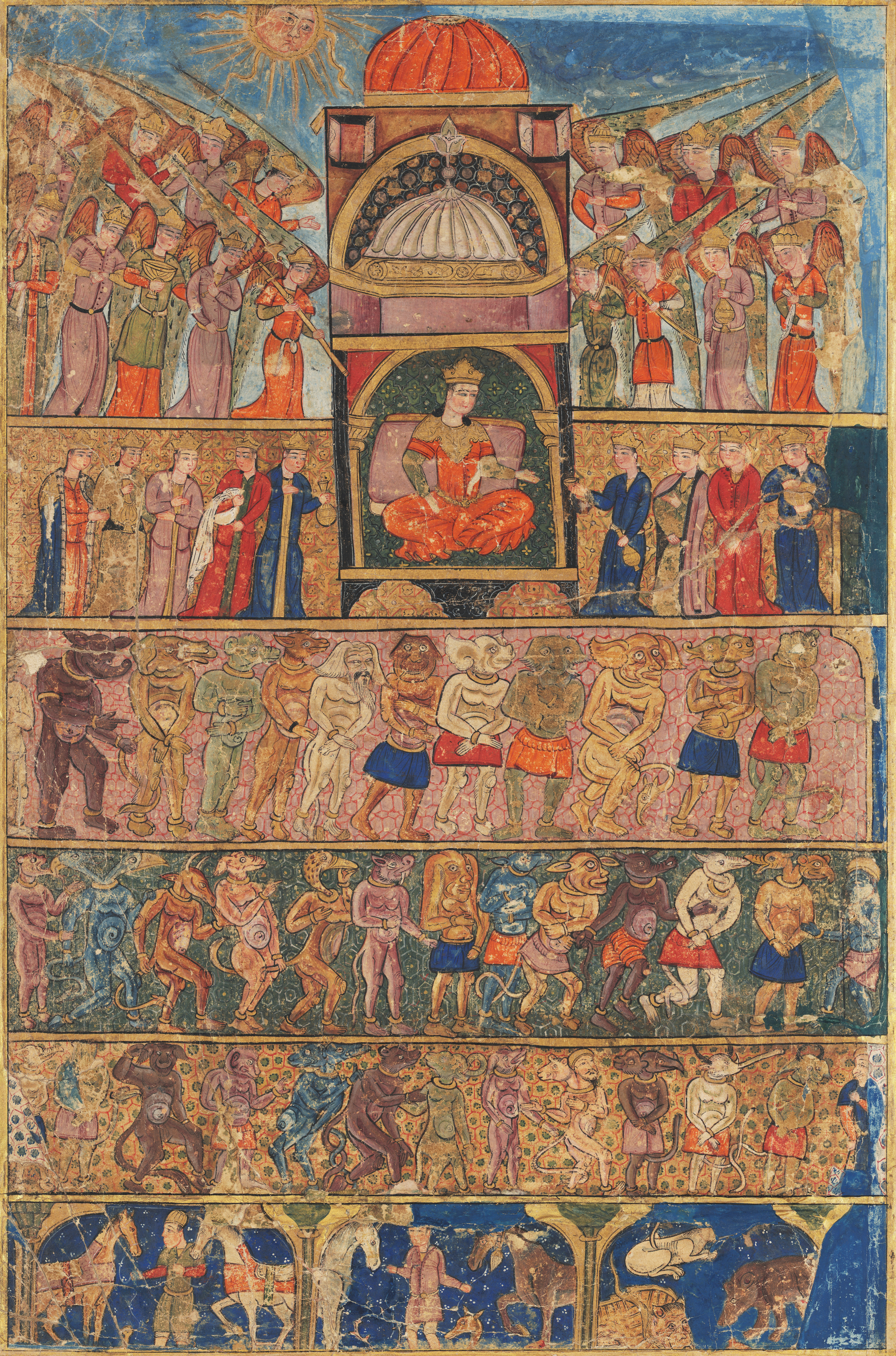
Bilqis Queen of Sheba Enthroned. From the Book of Solomon (Suleymannama) by Firdausi of Bursa made for Bayezid II (1481–1512). Chester Beatty Library

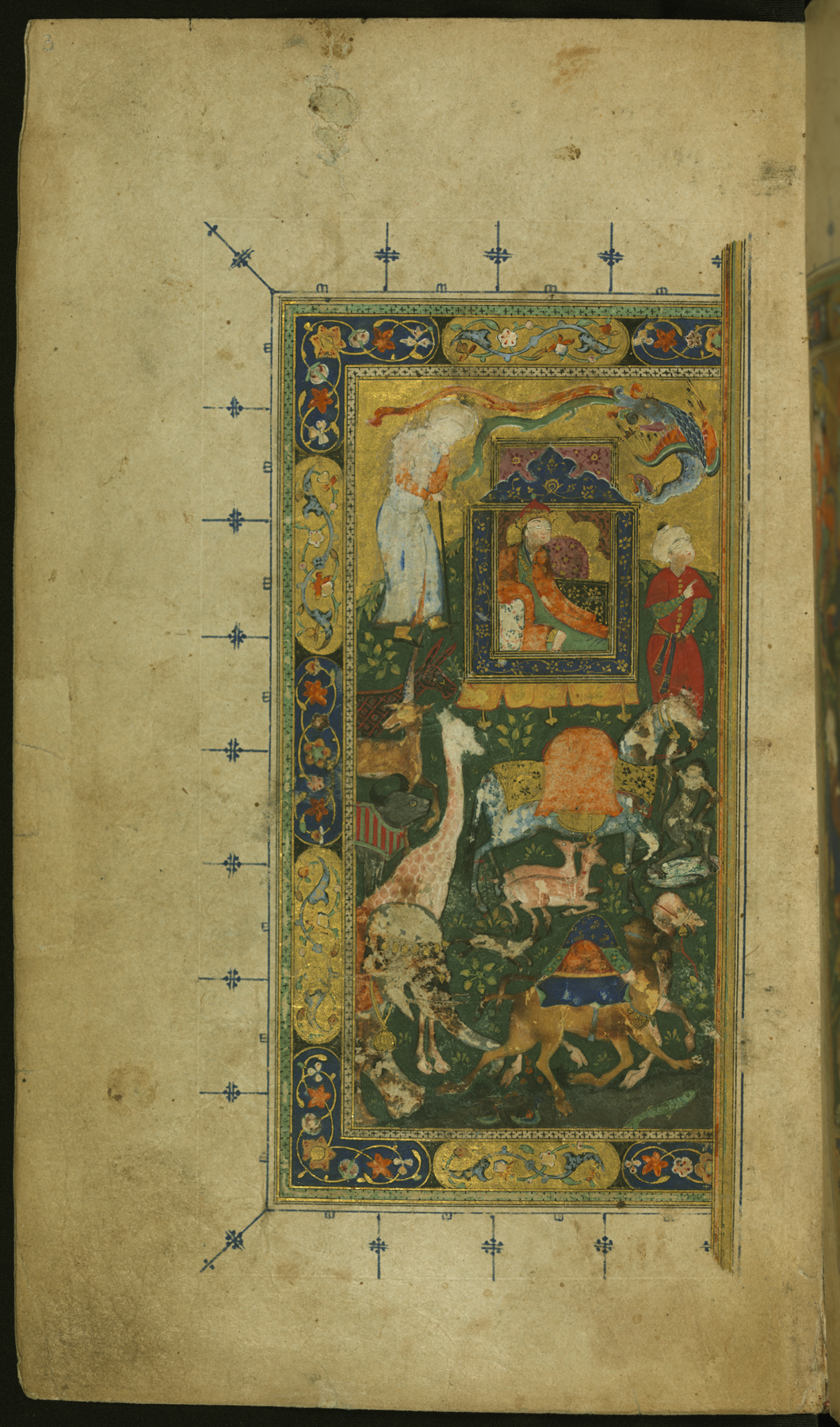
Illustration in a Hafez frontispiece depicting Queen Sheba, Walters manuscript W.631, around 1539

The Temple of Awwam or "Mahram Bilqis" ("Sanctuary of the Queen of Sheba") is a Sabaean temple dedicated to the principal deity of Saba, Almaqah (frequently called "Lord of ʾAwwām"), near Ma'rib in what is now Yemen.

I found [there] a woman ruling them, and she has been given of all things, and she has a great throne. I found that she and her people bow to the sun instead of God. Satan has made their deeds seem right to them and has turned them away from the right path, so they cannot find their way.

— Quran 27:23–24

In the above verse (ayah), after scouting nearby lands, a bird known as the hud-hud (hoopoe) returns to King Solomon relating that the land of Sheba is ruled by a queen. In a letter, Solomon invites the Queen of Sheba, who like her followers had worshipped the sun, to submit to God. She expresses that the letter is noble and asks her chief advisers what action should be taken. They respond by mentioning that her kingdom is known for its might and inclination towards war, however that the command rests solely with her. In an act suggesting the diplomatic qualities of her leadership, she responds not with brute force, but by sending her ambassadors to present a gift to King Solomon. He refuses the gift, declaring that God gives far superior gifts and that the ambassadors are the ones only delighted by the gift. King Solomon instructs the ambassadors to return to the Queen with a stern message that if he travels to her, he will bring a contingent that she cannot defeat. The Queen then makes plans to visit him at his palace. Before she arrives, King Solomon asks several of his chiefs who will bring him the Queen of Sheba's throne before they come to him in complete submission. An Ifrit first offers to move her throne before King Solomon would rise from his seat. However, a man with knowledge of the Scripture instead has her throne moved to King Solomon's palace in the blink of an eye, at which King Solomon exclaims his gratitude towards God as King Solomon assumes this is God's test to see if King Solomon is grateful or ungrateful. King Solomon disguises her throne to test her awareness of her own throne, asking her if it seems familiar. She answers that during her journey to him, her court had informed her of King Solomon's prophethood, and since then she and her subjects had made the intention to submit to God. King Solomon then explains that God is the only god that she should worship, not to be included alongside other false gods that she used to worship. Later the Queen of Sheba is requested to enter a palatial hall. Upon first view she mistakes the hall for a lake and raises her skirt to not wet her clothes. King Solomon informs her that is not water rather it is smooth slabs of glass. Recognizing that it was a marvel of construction which she had not seen the likes of before, she declares that in the past she had harmed her own soul but now submits, with King Solomon, to God (27:22–44).

She was told, "Enter the palace." But when she saw it, she thought it was a body of water and uncovered her shins [to wade through]. He said, "Indeed, it is a palace [whose floor is] made smooth with glass." She said, "My Lord, indeed I have wronged myself, and I submit with Solomon to God, Lord of the worlds."

— Quran 27:44

The story of the Queen of Sheba in the Quran shares some similarities with the Bible and other Jewish sources. Some Muslim commentators such as Al-Tabari, Al-Zamakhshari and Al-Baydawi supplement the story. Here they claim that the Queen's name is Bilqīs (Arabic: بِلْقِيْس), probably derived from Greek: παλλακίς, romanized: pallakis or the Hebraised pilegesh ("concubine"). The Quran does not name the Queen, referring to her as "a woman ruling them" (Arabic: امْرَأَةً تَمْلِكُهُمْ), the nation of Sheba.

According to some, he then married the Queen, while other traditions say that he gave her in marriage to a King of Hamdan. According to the scholar Al-Hamdani, the Queen of Sheba was the daughter of Ilsharah Yahdib, the Sabaean king of South Arabia. In another tale, she is said to be the daughter of a jinni (or peri) and a human. According to E. Ullendorff, the Quran and its commentators have preserved the earliest literary reflection of her complete legend, which among scholars complements the narrative that is derived from a Jewish tradition, this assuming to be the Targum Sheni. However, according to the Encyclopaedia Judaica Targum Sheni is dated to around 700 similarly the general consensus is to date Targum Sheni to late 7th- or early 8th century, which post-dates the advent of Islam by almost 200 years. Furthermore, M. J. Berdichevsky explains that this Targum is the earliest narrative articulation of Queen of Sheba in Jewish tradition.

== Scholarly interpretations ==
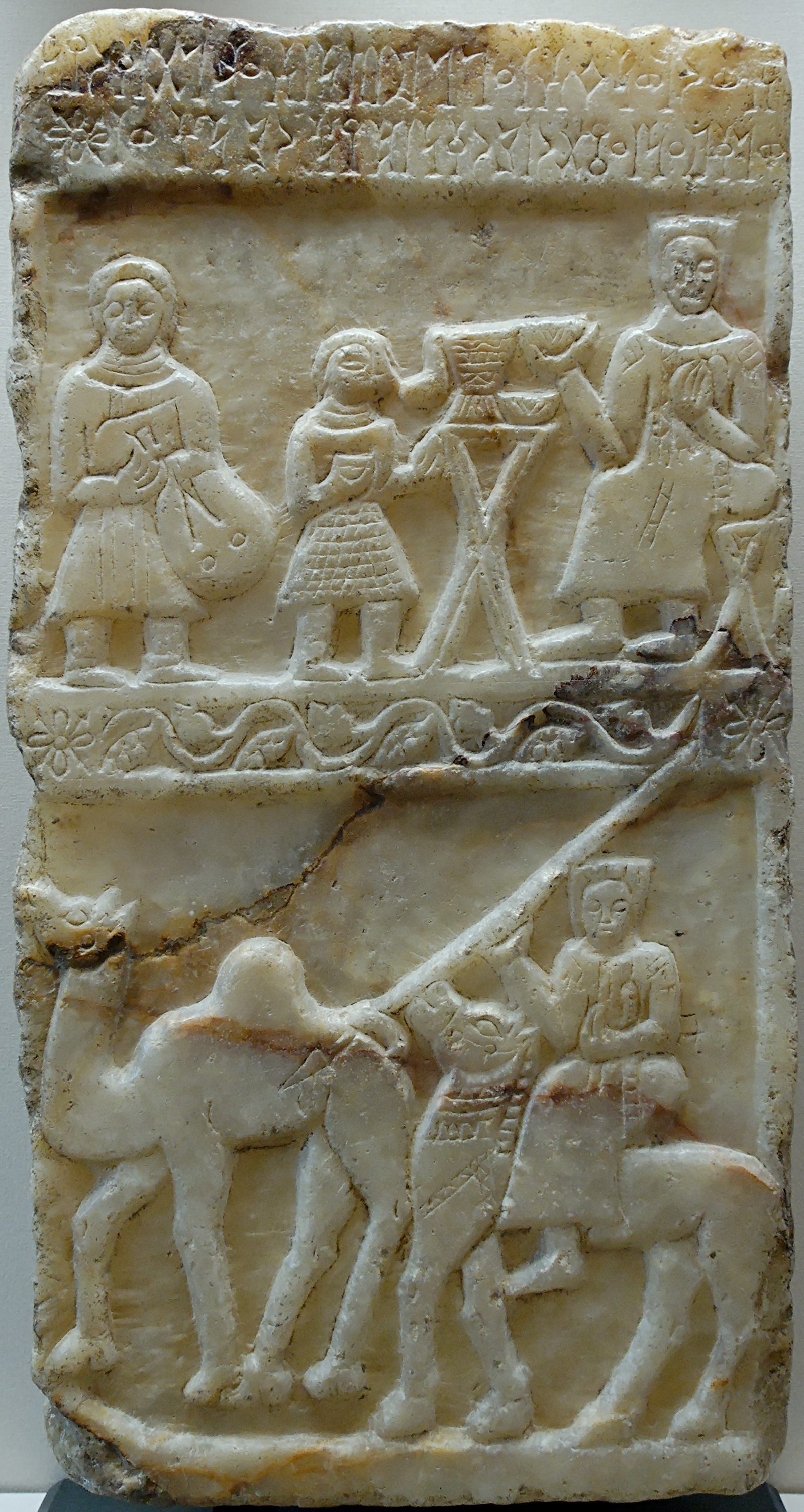
Sabaean stele: a feast and a camel driver, with an inscription in Sabaean on top

=== Folding of the Hebrew Bible's story ===
The dating of the story of the Queen of Sheba is not well established. A significant number of biblical philologists believe that an early version of the story of the Queen of Sheba existed before the composition of the Deuteronomistic history (c. 640–609 BCE) and was revised and placed therein by an anonymous redactor labelled the Deuteronomist (Dtr) by textual scholars. However, many scholars believe that the account from the Third Book of Kings in its present form was compiled during the so-called Second Deuteronomic Revision (Dtr2), produced during the Babylonian Captivity (c. 550 BCE). The purpose of the story seems to be to glorify the figure of King Solomon, who is portrayed as a ruler who enjoyed authority and captured the imagination of other rulers. Such an exaltation is dissonant with the general critical tone of the Deuteronomic history towards King Solomon. Later, this account was also placed in II Chronicles, written in the Settlement era.

=== Hypotheses and archaeological evidence ===
Researchers have noted that the Queen of Sheba's visit to Jerusalem could conceivably have been a trade mission related to the Israelite king's efforts to settle on the shores of the Red Sea and thereby undermine the monopoly of Saba and other South Arabian kingdoms on caravan trade with Syria and Mesopotamia. Assyrian sources confirm that South Arabia was engaged in international trade as early as 890 BC, so the arrival in Jerusalem in Solomon's time of a trading mission from a South Arabian kingdom is plausible.

There is, however, debate about the chronological plausibility of this event: Solomon lived from approximately 965 to 926 BC, while it has been argued that the first traces of the Sabean monarchy appear some 150 years later. On the other hand, Peter Stein argues that archaeological and epigraphic evidence indicates that the Sabean kingdom had already emerged by the 10th century BC.

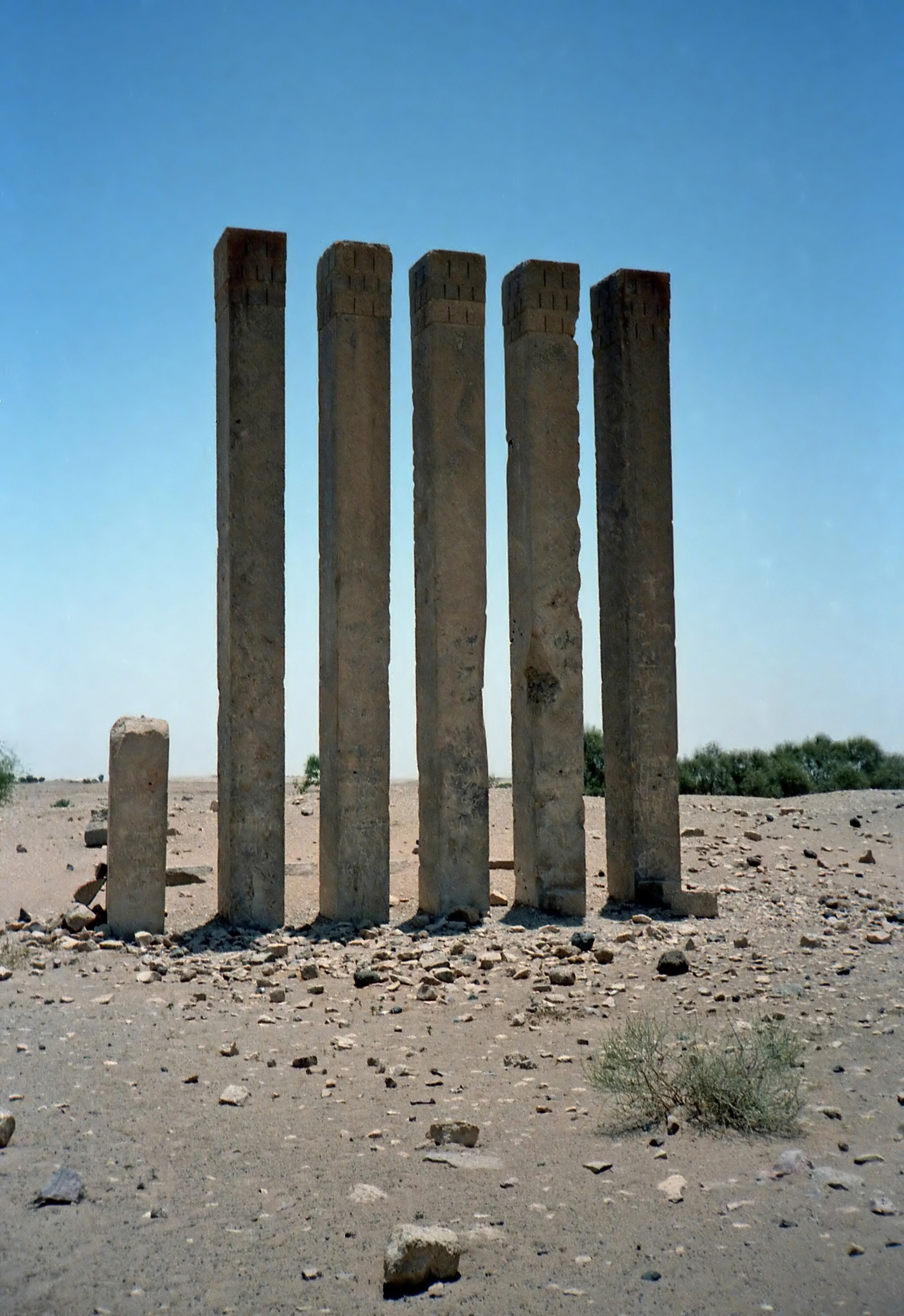
The ruins of the Temple of the Sun in Maribe. Built in the 8th century BC, it existed for 1,000 years

In the 19th century, explorers I. Halevi and Glaser found in the Arabian Desert the ruins of the huge city of Marib. Among the inscriptions found, scientists read the name of four South Arabian states: Minea, Hadramawt, Qataban, and Sawa. As it turned out, the residence of the kings of Sheba was the city of Marib (modern Yemen), which confirms the traditional version of the queen's origin from the south of the Arabian Peninsula. Inscriptions found in southern Arabia do not mention female rulers, but from Assyrian documents of the 8th-7th century BC, Arabian queens in the more northern regions of Arabia are known. In the 1950s Wendell Philips excavated the temple of the goddess Balqis at Marib.

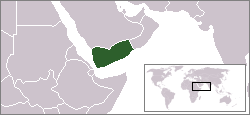
Yemen - Territory where the queen probably came from

Ethiopia - The country where her son may have ruled

Researchers attribute the origin of the legend about the son of the Queen of Sheba in Ethiopia to the fact that apparently in the 6th century BC the Sabaeans, having crossed the Bab el-Mandeb Strait, settled near the Red Sea and occupied part of Ethiopia, 'capturing' the memory of its ruler with her and transplanting it to new soil. One of the provinces of Ethiopia bears the name Shewa (Shawa, modern. Shoa).

The viewpoint according to which the birthplace of the Queen of Sheba or her prototype was not South Arabia but North Arabia is also quite widespread. Among other North Arabian tribes, the Sabaeans are mentioned on the stela of Tiglath-Pileser III. These northern Sabeans can be associated in a number of ways with the Sabeans (Sabeans) mentioned in the book of Job (Job 1:15), the Sheba of the book of the prophet Ezekiel (Ezekiel 27:22), and with Abraham's grandson Sheba (Genesis 25:3, cf. also Genesis 10:7, Genesis 10:28) (the name of Sheba's brother Dedan, mentioned next to it, is associated with the oasis of El-Ula north of Medina). According to some scholars, the Kingdom of Israel first came into contact with the northern Sabaeans, and only later, perhaps through their mediation, with Saba in the south. The historian J. A. Montgomery has suggested that in the 10th century BC the Sabeans lived in northern Arabia, although they controlled trade routes from the south.

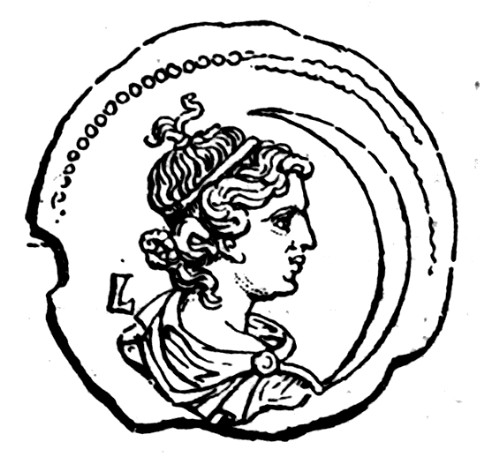
Zenobia, queen of Palmyra, which Harry St John Philby considered the origin of later legends about the Queen of Sheba

The famous Arabian explorer Harry St John Philby also believed that the Queen of Sheba did not originate from Southern Arabia, but from Northern Arabia, and that the legends about her at some point blended with the stories of Zenobia, the warrior queen of Palmyra (modern Tadmor, Syria), who lived in the 3rd century CE. For example, it is told (by one of Mohammed's biographers) that it was in Palmyra, in the 8th century during the reign of Caliph Walid I, that a sarcophagus was found with the inscription: 'Here is buried the pious Bilqis, the consort of Solomon...'. Jewish Kabbalistic tradition also considers Tadmor to be the burial place of the Queen, an evil deviless, and the city is considered an ominous haven for demons. There are also parallels between Sheba and another eastern autocrat, the famous Semiramis, also a warrior and irrigator who lived around the same time, in the late 9th century BC, which can be traced in folklore. Thus, the 2nd-century AD writer Melito of Sardis retells a Syrian legend in which the father of Semiramis is called Hadhad. In addition, the Hebrew legend made the queen the mother of Nebuchadnezzar and Semiramis his wife.

== In art and culture ==
=== Medieval ===
The 12th century cathedrals at Strasbourg, Chartres, Rochester and Canterbury include artistic renditions in stained glass windows and doorjamb decorations. Likewise of Romanesque art, the enamel depiction of a black woman at Klosterneuburg Monastery. The Queen of Sheba, standing in water before Solomon, is depicted on a window in King's College Chapel, Cambridge.

=== Renaissance ===
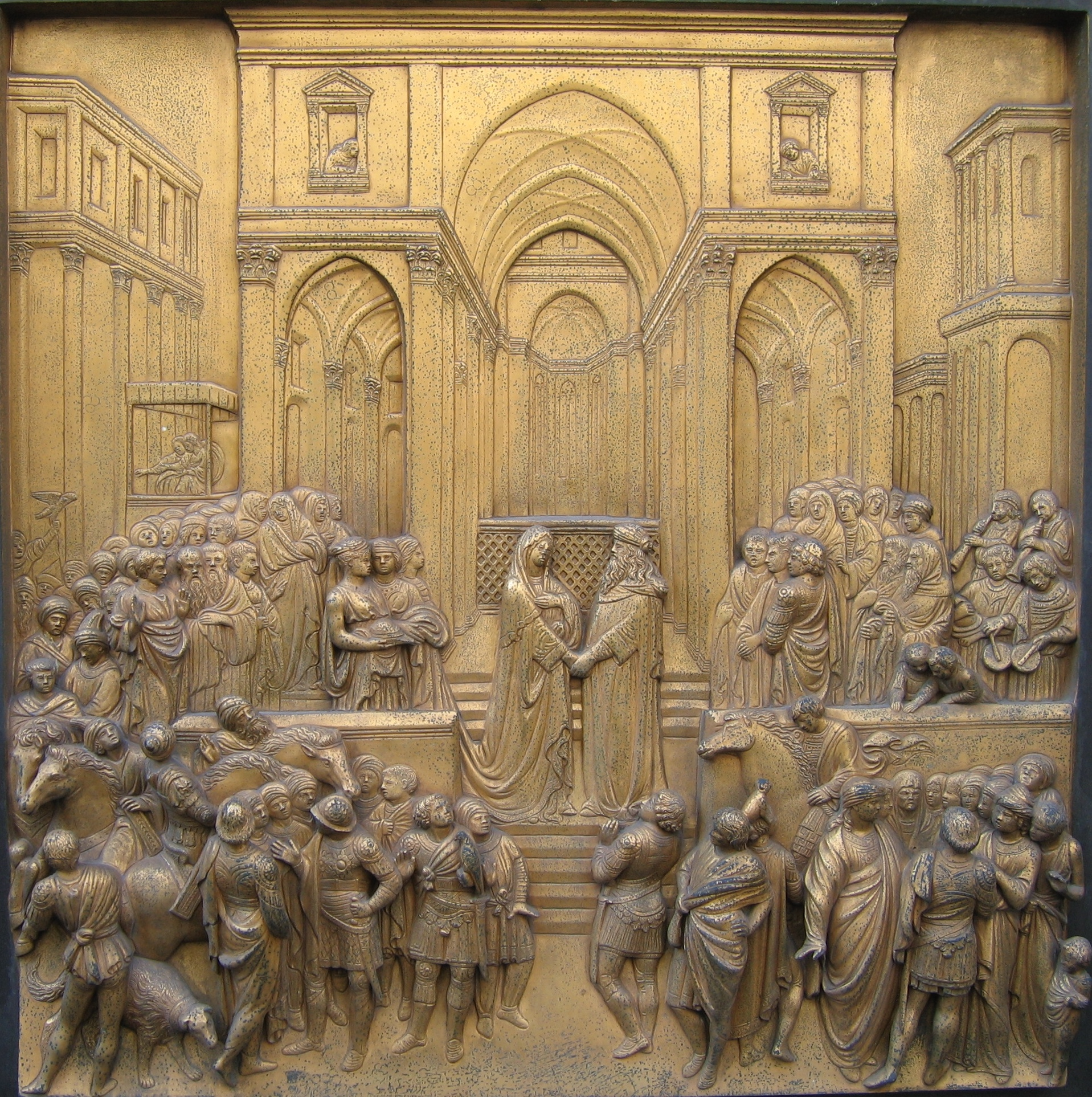
Florence Baptistry door, Lorenzo Ghiberti (1378‒1455), bronze relief.

The Queen of Sheba was a popular feature in the Italian Renaissance. It can be found in the doors of the Florence Baptistery by Lorenzo Ghiberti, frescoes by Benozzo Gozzoli in Pisa, and in the Raphael Loggie.

Piero della Francesca's frescoes in Arezzo (c. 1466) on the Legend of the True Cross contain two panels on the visit of the Queen of Sheba to Solomon. The legend links the beams of Solomon's palace (adored by Queen of Sheba) to the wood of the crucifixion. The Renaissance continuation of the analogy between the Queen's visit to Solomon and the adoration of the Magi is evident in the Triptych of the Adoration of the Magi (c. 1510) by Hieronymus Bosch.

=== Literature ===
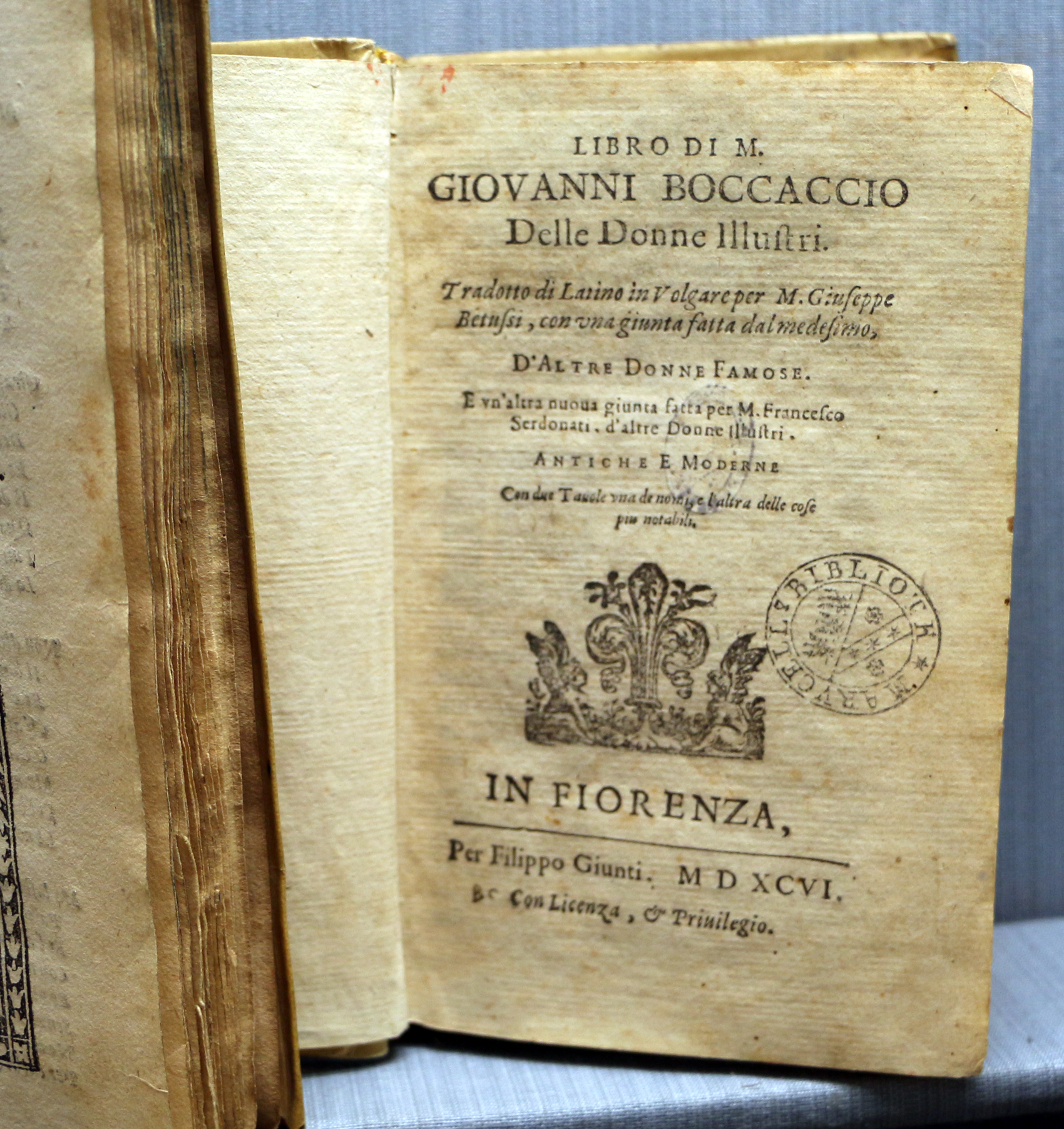
Boccaccio's On Famous Women

Boccaccio's On Famous Women (Latin: De Mulieribus Claris) follows Josephus in calling the Queen of Sheba Nicaula. Boccaccio writes she is the Queen of Ethiopia and Egypt, and that some people say she is also the queen of Arabia. He writes that she had a palace on "a very large island" called Meroe, located in the Nile river. From there Nicaula travelled to Jerusalem to see King Solomon.

O. Henry's short story The Gift of the Magi contains the following description to convey the preciousness of the protagonist Della Dillingham Young's hair: "Had the queen of Sheba lived in the flat across the airshaft, Della would have let her hair hang out the window some day to dry just to depreciate Her Majesty's jewels and gifts."

Christine de Pizan's The Book of the City of Ladies continues the convention of calling the Queen of Sheba "Nicaula". The author praises the Queen for secular and religious wisdom and lists her besides Christian and Hebrew prophetesses as first on a list of dignified female pagans.

Christopher Marlowe's Doctor Faustus refers to the Queen of Sheba as Saba, when Mephistopheles is trying to persuade Faustus of the wisdom of the women with whom he supposedly shall be presented every morning.

Gérard de Nerval's autobiographical novel, Voyage to the Orient (1851), details his travels through the Middle East with much artistic license. He recapitulates at length a tale told in a Turkish cafe of King Soliman's love of Balkis, the Queen of Saba, but she, in turn, is destined to love Adoniram (Hiram Abif), Soliman's chief craftsman of the Temple, owing to both her and Adoniram's divine genealogy. Soliman grows jealous of Adoniram, and when he learns of three craftsmen who wish to sabotage his work and later kill him, Soliman willfully ignores warnings of these plots. Adoniram is murdered and Balkis flees Soliman's kingdom.

Léopold Sédar Senghor's "Elégie pour la Reine de Saba", published in his Elégies majeures in 1976, uses the Queen of Sheba in a love poem and for a political message. In the 1970s, he used the Queen of Sheba fable to widen his view of Negritude and Eurafrique by including "Arab-Berber Africa".

Rudyard Kipling's book Just So Stories includes the tale of The Butterfly that Stamped. Therein, Kipling identifies Balkis, "Queen that was of Sheba and Sable and the Rivers of the Gold of the South" as best, and perhaps only, beloved of the 1000 wives of Suleiman-bin-Daoud, King Solomon. She is explicitly ascribed great wisdom ("Balkis, almost as wise as the Most Wise Suleiman-bin-Daoud"); nevertheless, Kipling perhaps implies in her a greater wisdom than her husband, in that she is able to gently manipulate him, the afrits and djinns he commands, the other quarrelsome 999 wives of Suleimin-bin-Daoud, the butterfly of the title and the butterfly's wife, thus bringing harmony and happiness for all.

The Queen of Sheba appears as a character in The Ring of Solomon, the fourth book in Jonathan Stroud's Bartimaeus Sequence. She is portrayed as a vain woman who, fearing Solomon's great power, sends the captain of her royal guard to assassinate him, setting the events of the book in motion.

In modern popular culture, she is often invoked as a sarcastic retort to a person with an inflated sense of entitlement, as in "Who do you think you are, the Queen of Sheba?"

=== Film ===
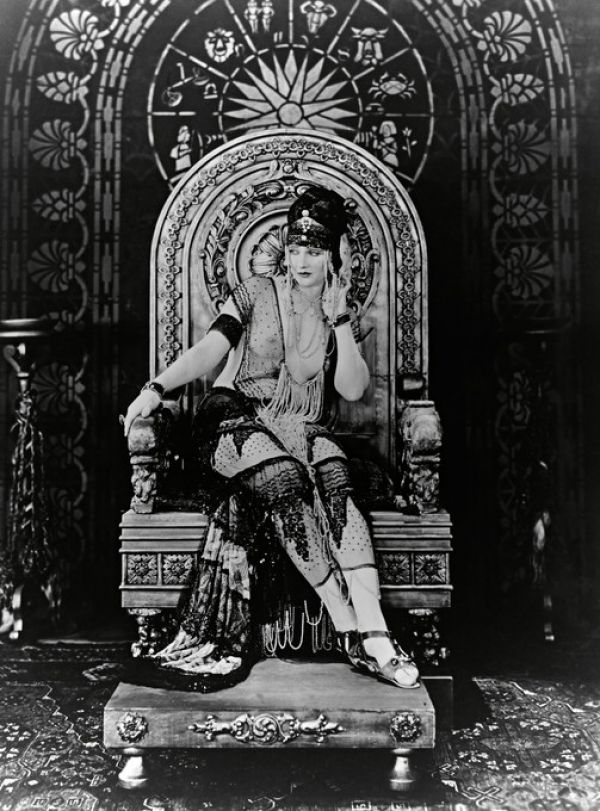
Betty Blythe as the queen in The Queen of Sheba (1921).

- Played by Gabrielle Robinne in La reine de Saba (1913)
- Played by Betty Blythe in The Queen of Sheba (1921)
- Played by France Dhélia in Le berceau de dieu (1926)
- Played by Dorothy Page in King Solomon of Broadway (1935)
- Played by Leonora Ruffo in The Queen of Sheba (1952)
- Played by Gina Lollobrigida in Solomon and Sheba (1959)
- Played by Winifred Bryan in Queen of Sheba Meets the Atom Man (1963)
- Played by Anya Phillips in Rome '78 (1978)
- Played by Halle Berry in Solomon & Sheba (1995)
- Played by Vivica A. Fox in Solomon (film) (1997)
- Played by Aamito Lagum in Three Thousand Years of Longing (2022)

=== Music ===
Arrival of the Queen of Sheba
The Arrival of the Queen of Sheba by Georg Friedrich Händel.

- Solomon (composed in 1748; first performed in 1749), oratorio by George Frideric Handel; "The Arrival of the Queen of Sheba" from this work is often performed as a concert piece
- La reine de Saba (1862), opera by Charles Gounod
- Die Königin von Saba (1875), opera by Karl Goldmark
- La Reine de Scheba (1926), opera by Reynaldo Hahn
- Belkis, Regina di Saba (1931), ballet by Ottorino Respighi
- Solomon and Balkis (1942), opera by Randall Thompson
- The Queen of Sheba (1953), cantata for women's voices by Mario Castelnuovo-Tedesco
- "Black Beauty" (1970), song by Focus
- "Leila, the Queen of Sheba" (1981), song by Dolly Dots
- "Throne of Gold" (1984), song by Steel Pulse
- "Sheba" (1989), song by Bad Brains
- "The Original Queen of Sheba" (1991), song by Great White
- "Machine Gun" (1993), by Slowdive
- "Aïcha" (1996), by Khaled
- "Makeda" (1998), French-language R&B by French-Cameroonian duo Les Nubians
- "Balqis" (2000), song by Siti Nurhaliza
- "Thing Called Love" (1987), song by John Hiatt

=== Television ===
- Played by Halle Berry in Solomon & Sheba (1995)
- Played by Vivica A. Fox in Solomon (1997)
- Played by Andrulla Blanchette in Lexx, Season 4, Episode 21: "Viva Lexx Vegas" (2002)
- Played by Amani Zain in Queen of Sheba: Behind the Myth (2002)
- Played by Yetide Badaki in American Gods as Bilquis

== See also ==
- Arwa al-Sulayhi
- Banu Hamdan
- Barran Temple, also known as "Throne of Bilqis"
- Belkis
- Bilkisu
- Bilikisu Sungbo
- Belqeys Castle
- Biblical and Quranic narratives
- Bilocation
- Hadhramaut
- List of legendary monarchs of Ethiopia
- Minaeans
- Qahtanite
- Qataban
- Sudabeh

== Bibliography ==
- Kisāʾī, Qiṣaṣ (1356 A.H.), 285–92
- G. Rosch, Die Königin von Saba als Königin Bilqis (Jahrb. f. Prot. Theol., 1880) 524‒72
- Thaʿlabī, Qiṣaṣ ̣(1356 A.H.), 262–
- G. Weil, The Bible, the Koran, and the Talmud ... (1846)
- M. Grünbaum, Neue Beiträge zur semitischen Sagenkunde (1893) 211‒21
- E. Littmann, The legend of the Queen of Sheba in the tradition of Axum (1904)
- L. Ginzberg, Legends of the Jews, 3 (1911), 411; 4 (1913), 143–9; (1928), 288–91
- H. Speyer, Die biblischen Erzählungen im Qoran (1931, repr. 1961), 390–9
- E. Budge, The Queen of Sheba and her only son Menyelek (1932)
- J. Ryckmans, L'Institution monarchique en Arabie méridionale avant l'Islam (1951)
- E. Ullendorff, Candace (Acts VIII, 27) and the Queen of Sheba (New Testament Studies, 1955, 53‒6)
- E. Ullendorff, Hebraic-Jewish elements in Abyssinian (monophysite) Christianity (JSS, 1956, 216‒56)
- D. Hubbard, The literary sources of the Kebra Nagast (St. Andrews University Ph.D. thesis, 1956, 278‒308)
- La Persécution des chrétiens himyarites au sixième siècle (1956)
- Bulletin of American Schools of Oriental Research 143 (1956) 6–10; 145 (1957) 25–30; 151 (1958) 9–16
- A. Jamme, La Paléographique sud-arabe de J. Pirenne (1957)
- R. Bowen, F. Albright (eds.), Archaeological Discoveries in South Arabia (1958)
- Encyclopedic Dictionary of the Bible (1963) 2067–70
- T. Tamrat, Church and State in Ethiopia (1972) 1270–1527
- W. Daum (ed.), Die Königin von Saba: Kunst, Legende und Archäologie zwischen Morgenland und Abendland (1988)
- J. Lassner, Demonizing the Queen of Sheba: Boundaries of Gender and Culture in Postbiblical Judaism and Medieval Islam (1993)
- M. Brooks (ed.), Kebra Nagast (The Glory of Kings) (1998)
- J. Breton, Arabia Felix from the Time of the Queen of Sheba: Eighth Century B.C. to First Century A.D. (1999)
- D. Crummey, Land and Society in the Christian Kingdom of Ethiopia: From the Thirteenth to the Twentieth Century (2000)
- A. Gunther (ed.), Caravan Kingdoms: Yemen and the Ancient Incense Trade (2005)
