= Belqeys Castle =

Archaeological complex in North Khorasan Province, Iran

- قلعه بلقیس
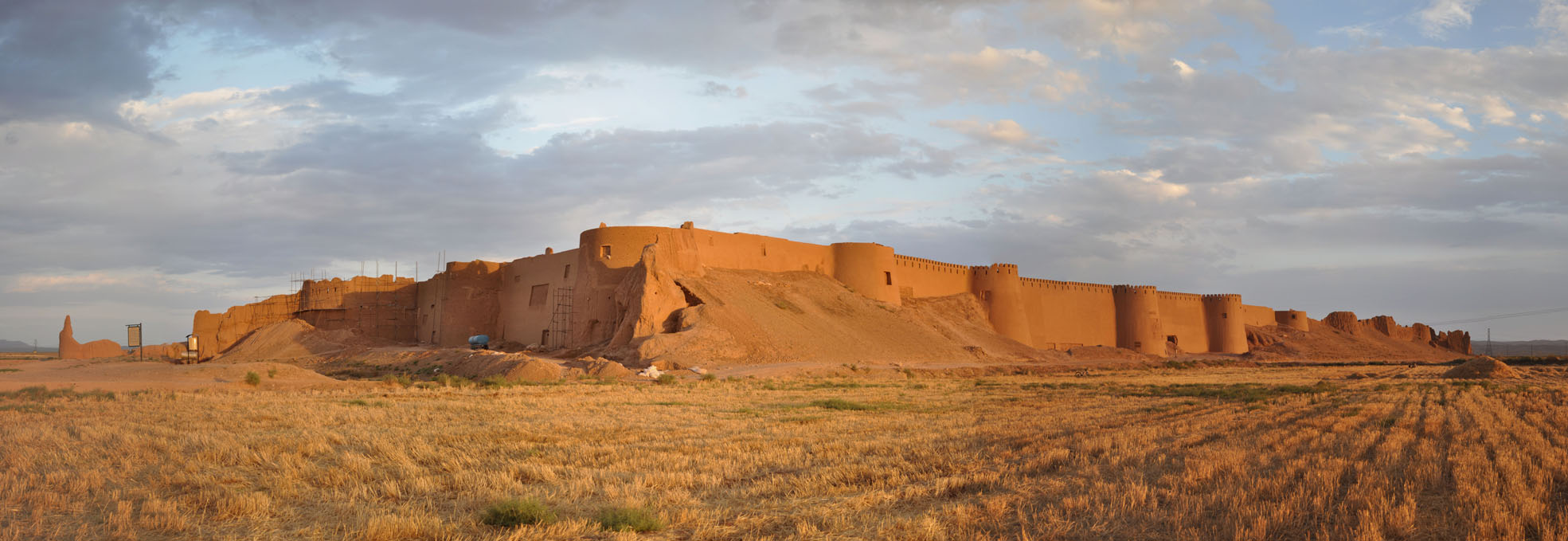
- Interactive map of the Belqeys Castle area

General information
- Type: Castle
- Location: Esfarayen, Iran
- Coordinates: 37.0428°N 57.4722°E

Belqeys Castle (Persian: قلعه بلقیس) is a castle located in Esfarayen County in North Khorasan Province, Iran. The fortress dates back to the Sasanian Empire.

== Geographical Location ==
The remains of this ancient city are located 5 kilometers southwest of Esfarayen, on the eastern edge of Joshaghan village, in the northeastern cultural area. The castle is 1.202 meters above sea level.

Belqeys Castle has an area of over 51,000m².

== See also ==
- Queen of Sheba
