= Balqis =

Bilqis or Balqis (Arabic: بلقيس, romanized: Bilqīs) is a feminine given name of Arabic origin. Notable people with the name include:

== Given name ==
- Bilqis, the Arabic known name of the Queen of Sheba
- Balqees (singer) (born 1988), widely known by the mononym "Balqees", Emirati singer.
- Bilqis Abdul-Qaadir (born 1990), American basketball player
- Bilqis Prasista (born 2003), Indonesian badminton player
- Balqis Sidawi (born 1935), Lebanese writer and poet
