= The Butterfly that Stamped =

Story by Rudyard Kipling

- Author: Rudyard Kipling
- Language: English
- Release number: 12
- Genre: Children's literature
- Published: 1902
- Publication place: United Kingdom
- Preceded by: The Cat that Walked by Himself
- Followed by: The Tabu Tale

"The Butterfly that Stamped" is part of a series of short stories known as Just So Stories (1902) by Rudyard Kipling. These are collected short stories. The stories explain how things supposedly came to be.

== Plot ==
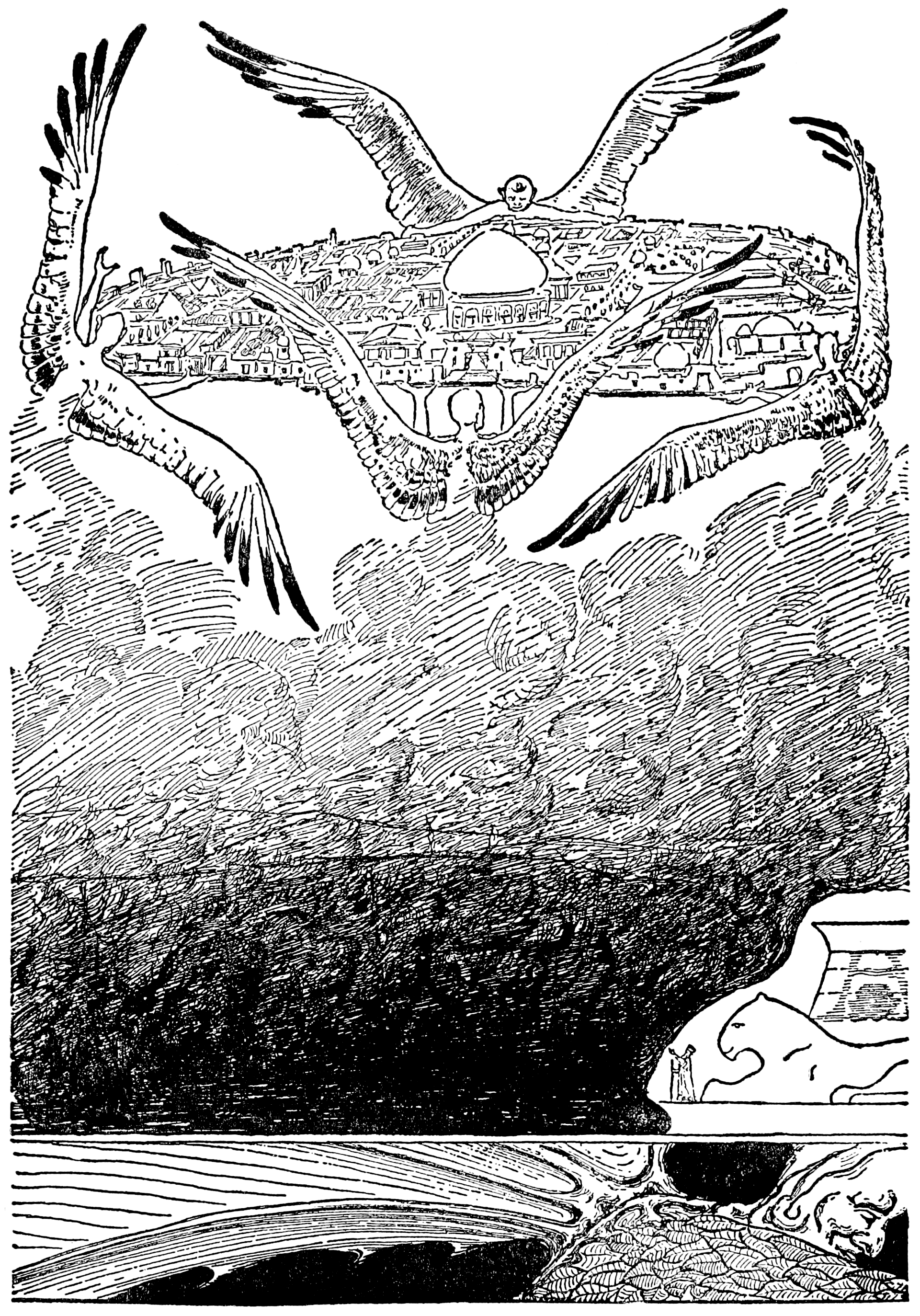
"The Butterfly that Stamped" from "Rudyard Kipling's Just So Stories"

"The Butterfly that Stamped" is one of the stories that is about King Solomon, his lovely wife Balkis, the Queen of Sheba (she is the one he is in love with, and she loves him, in most versions the others are there just because he is king and has to have more wives than anyone else), his other nine-hundred ninety nine wives, and two charming, but quarrelsome, butterflies.

Solomon (who mainly goes by Suleiman bin Daoud in the story) is a very wise man, but is very annoyed with his surplus wives and all their quarreling. He thinks they are very loud and ungrateful. He refuses to use his magic to do anything about it because he believes it is just showing off, something he swore to refrain from doing after an embarrassing moment when he provided a feast for all life only for it to be devoured by a sea monster named "Small Porgies."

One day, when walking in his forest, Suleiman bin Daoud stumbles upon two butterflies arguing. The male butterfly tells his wife he could stamp his foot and the huge palace garden would disappear in a bid to control her because she is quarreling with him, and as he tells the king "you know how women are." Suleiman bin Daoud finds the claim amusing and calls the butterfly over. After asking the butterfly why he lied, he tells the butterfly that if he has to, he will help him.

Meanwhile, Balkis has a talk with the butterfly's wife, who says she is only pretending to agree with him, because "you know how men are." Balkis tells her she should dare her husband to stamp his foot, as he must be lying, and then she can argue with him again. Really, she is hoping the disappearance of the palace will shock the other wives into obedience.

The female butterfly dares her husband, who prevaricates by saying the king called him over to ask him not to, because he is afraid of the butterfly. The wife insists he stamps, and he goes to the king, who tells him he will make it happen to help control his wife, sympathizing with the butterfly's plight. The butterfly stamps and the palace disappears.

This makes the butterfly's wife scared, and she promises never to argue with him again as long as he brings it back, leaving Solomon in fits of laughter. But when the garden vanishes, Solomon's quarrelling wives are deathly afraid, believing that the king is dead and the heavens are mourning the news. Balkis claims it was the butterfly who was angry at his wife, and they realise that "if the king will do this for the sake of a tiny butterfly, what will he do to us, we who have been making him miserable with our quarreling," and they in turn become scared of Solomon's powers, and are nice and quiet from then on.

Balkis then explains to Solomon what had happened, and how it was all for his benefit, for if he will do all this for the sake of a butterfly, it cannot be wrong to help himself occasionally, and they return to the palace.
