= Solomon & Sheba (1995 film) =

- Written by: Ronni Kern
- Directed by: Robert M. Young
- Starring: Halle Berry; Jimmy Smits
- Music by: David Kitay
- Country of origin: United States
- Original language: English

Production
- Producers: Dino De Laurentiis; Martha Schumacher
- Cinematography: Giuseppe Maccari
- Editor: Arthur Coburn
- Running time: 101 minutes
- Production company: Dino de Laurentiis Communications

Original release
- Network: Showtime
- Release: February 26, 1995

Solomon & Sheba is a 1995 American television biblical film directed by Robert M. Young and starring Halle Berry as the Queen of Sheba and Jimmy Smits as Israelite and Judaean King Solomon from the Old Testament biblical books of 1 Kings and 2 Chronicles. It premiered on Showtime on February 26, 1995. It was nominated for an NAACP Image Award for Outstanding Actress in a Television Movie, Mini-Series or Dramatic Special in 1996.

== Plot summary ==
It follows the biblical story of Queen of Sheba in South Arabia going on a caravan trip to meet the Israeli and Judaean King Solomon.

== Cast ==
- Halle Berry as Nikhaule / Queen Sheba
- Jimmy Smits as King Solomon
- Miguel Brown as House Keeper
- Norman Buckley as Israelite 1
- Ali Cherkaoui as The Scribe
- Kenneth Colley as Nathan
- Nickolas Grace as Jeroboam
- Chapman Roberts as King Yusef
