= Bilkisu Yusuf =

Nigerian journalist

Hajiya Bilkisu Yusuf
- Born: 2 December 1952
- Died: 24 September 2015 (aged 62); Mina, Saudi Arabia
- Education: Ahmadu Bello University (Bachelors); University of Wisconsin-Madison (Masters); Moscow State Institute of Journalism and International Relations
- Occupations: Journalist, columnist and editor
- Employer(s): Daily Trust and Leadership newspapers
- Organization(s): Women In Nigeria; Federation of Muslim Women's Associations in Nigeria, Advocacy Nigeria
- Known for: Journalism and women's rights activist
- Spouse(s): Alhaji Sanusi Ciroma Yusuf (first husband); Mustapha Bintube (second husband)
- Children: 2

Bilkisu Yusuf (2 December 1952 – 24 September 2015) was a Nigerian journalist, columnist and editor for prominent newspapers in Abuja, Kano and Kaduna, Nigeria. She is known in Nigeria for being the first woman to direct a national newspaper operation and served as editor for two more. She was a Hausa, Muslim, feminist, of Yoruba descent and advocate for interfaith society, who was known for being an adviser to the Nigerian President on International Affairs and the founding of NGOs, such as Women In Nigeria (WIN) and the Federation of Muslim Women's Association (FOMWAN). Yusuf was killed in the 2015 Mina disaster while on Haj in Mecca, Saudi Arabia.

== Personal life ==
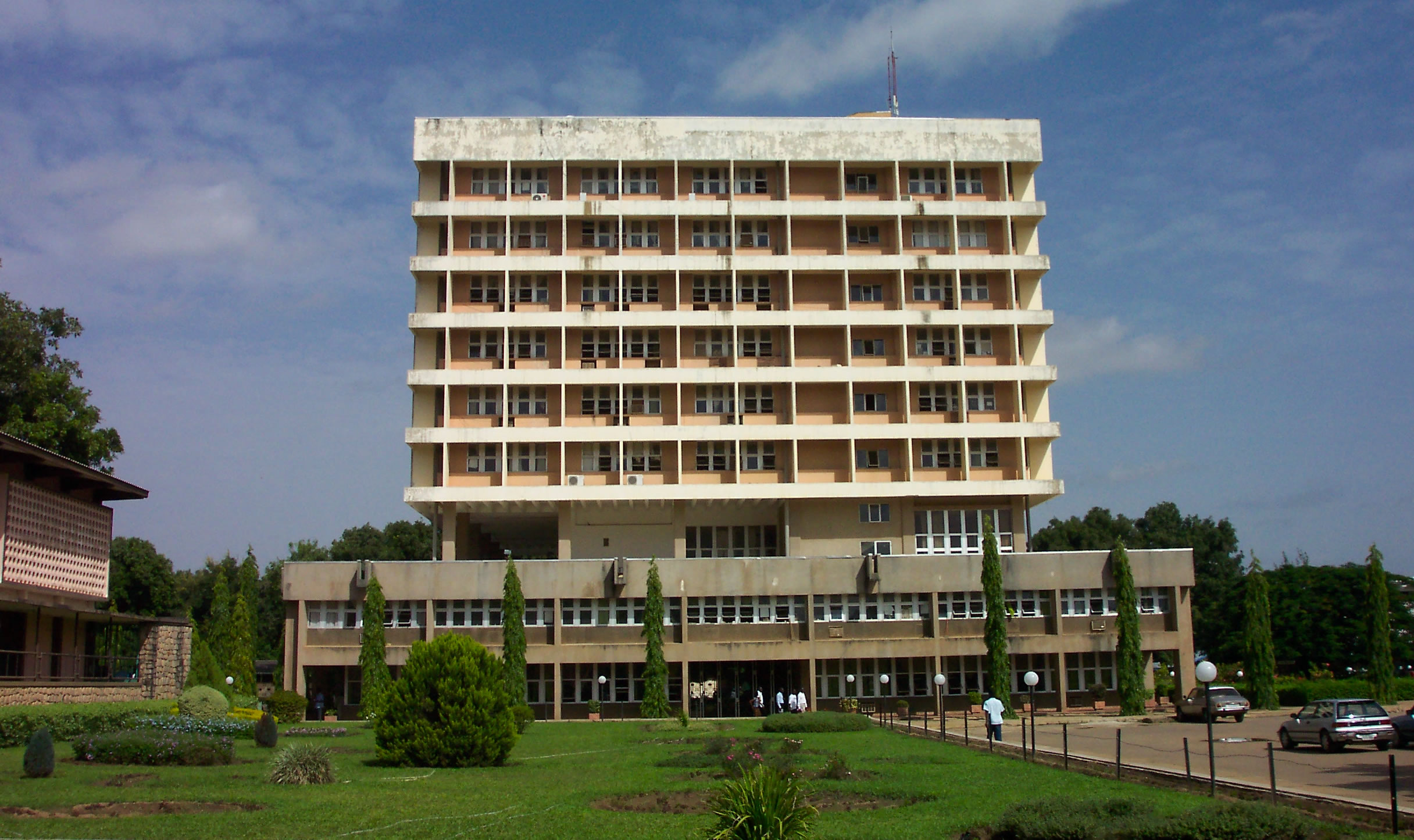
Yusuf attended Ahmadu Bello University and founded the organization Women in Nigeria there in the early 1980s.

Bilkisu Yusuf was born 2 December 1952. She advanced from her primary education at Ansar Primary School, Kano in 1964 to secondary school at the Government Girls College, Dala, Kano.

Yusuf's higher education was in both political science and journalism. She earned her bachelor's degree in political science at Ahmadu Bello University in Zaria, Nigeria; her master's degree in political science and international relations from the University of Wisconsin–Madison in Madison, Wisconsin, United States; and an advanced degree in journalism from the International Journalism School at Moscow State Institute of International Relations in Moscow, Russia, in 1986.

She was first married to Alhaji Sanusi Ciroma Yusuf, who eventually became the Chief Judge of State. The couple had two children, a son, Moshood Sanusi Yusuf and a daughter, Nana Fatima. They later divorced. Her first husband died at the age of 73. She married her second husband, Mustapha Bintube.

Hajiya Bilkisu Yusuf was given the honorary title Hajiya after completing the pilgrimage to Mecca (Haji is the male form). She died while serving as a leader of women on behalf of the National Hajj Commission of Nigeria.

== Career ==
Bilkisu Yusuf was a journalist for the Daily Trust and Leadership newspapers in Abuja, Nigeria. After her return from the University of Wisconsin-Madison, she became the first female editor at the Sunday Triumph, Kano, from 1983–1987. She also held the title of editor at the New Nigerian, Kaduna, in 1987 and Citizen Magazine, Kaduna, in 1990. She was known for her column "Civil Society Watch". She was active in The Nigeria Association of Women Journalists (NAWOJ), which mentored young female journalists in Nigeria.

Yusuf was the adviser to the Nigerian President on International Affairs. She was also a notable women's right's activist. She founded several NGOs, such as Women In Nigeria (WIN), which was one of the earliest feminist organizations in Nigeria, Federation of Muslim Women's Associations in Nigeria (FOMWAN), the Nigerian Interfaith Action Association Against Malaria (NIFAAM), and Health Reform Foundation of Nigeria (HERFON), She was executive director of Advocacy Nigeria. She was also active in the Bring Back Our Girls, which was aimed at the safe return of the Chibok girls.

== Death ==
A stampede occurred at an intersection in Mina, Saudi Arabia on 24 September 2015, at about 9 a.m. The crowds were on their way from Muzdalifah to Jaramat, where pilgrims cast stones at pillars to symbolize the stoning of the devil during the Hajj. From there they would head to the Grand Mosque in Mecca. Over 2,000 pilgrims were trampled to death during the stampede and almost 200 of those were identified as Nigerian citizens. Bilkisu Yusuf was identified among those killed by the stampede. Other prominent Nigerians who were trampled to death in the stampede include Professor Tijjani El-Miskin.

== Reactions ==
The office of Nigerian President Muhammadu Buhari released the following statement following the stampede: "President Buhari commiserates with the Nigerian Guild of Editors and the Nigerian Union of Journalists on the sad loss of Hajiya Bilkisu, an exemplary, dedicated, knowledgeable, very credible, highly-respected, outstanding editor and columnist who, even in death, will remain a glittering role model for journalists, within and outside Nigeria."

Jibrin Ibrahim, director of the Centre for Democracy and Development described Yusuf as "great humanist, advocate, journalist, networker and above all a devoted Muslim, who died in the course of serving God."

Dr Oby Ezekwesili, director of Bring Back Our Girls and a former minister of Education in Nigeria, said, "Bilkisu fought all her life for child education. She has been consistent on her advocacy. She never wearied until it was time to go. We celebrate the great strides of our sister. We were delighted to have her as part of our extended family."

Aliyu Muktar, a former editor at Triumph newspaper who worked with Yusuf, said, "She was for me a role model; an excellent career woman, very thorough and unassuming. You know, she was brave, sincere and always fighting for the downtrodden. You also know her antecedent; Hajia was somebody who would not tolerate injustice anywhere."

== Appearances in culture ==
Bilkisu Yusuf was one of the 42 journalists interviewed for the encyclopedic reference Nigerian Journalism written by Mike Awoyinfa and Dimgba Igwe.

== See also ==
- Hausa people
- Incidents during the Hajj
- Women in Nigeria
