= Balqis Sidawi =

Lebanese writer and poet (born 1935)

- Born: 1935 (age 90–91); Nabatieh
- Known for: writer and poet
- Spouse: Yousef Sidawi

Balqis Sidawi (born 1935) is a Lebanese writer and poet from Nabatieh, Lebanon.

She attended Biblical schools in Nabatieh and later studied at the American Evangelical School in Beirut. From here, she graduated with a degree in Arabic literature from the Community School in Beirut. Sidawi resided in Freetown, Sierra Leone for several years before relocating back to Lebanon.

She has authored several poetic narratives, such as Whispers from Saba (1998), Damua Sings (1998), and Buqaya and Zul (1998). She wrote the poetic play Ray Me in the Jungle (1998) and a research piece titled Marie Khoury. Balqis participated in poetry festivals in Lebanon and composed the official anthem of the Lebanese Civil Defense. She also recited her poems on Lebanese radio and television.
