= Edward Slocombe =

British painter (1850–1915)

- Born: 1850; London, England
- Died: 1915 (aged 64–65); London, England
- Elected: Royal Society of Painter-Etchers and Engravers

Signature
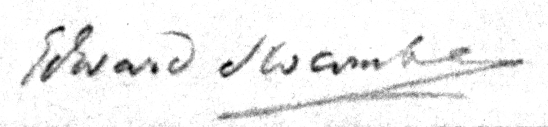

Edward C. Slocombe (1850 – 1915) was a British painter who was a member of the Royal Society of Painter-Etchers from 1883 to 1915.

== Biography ==
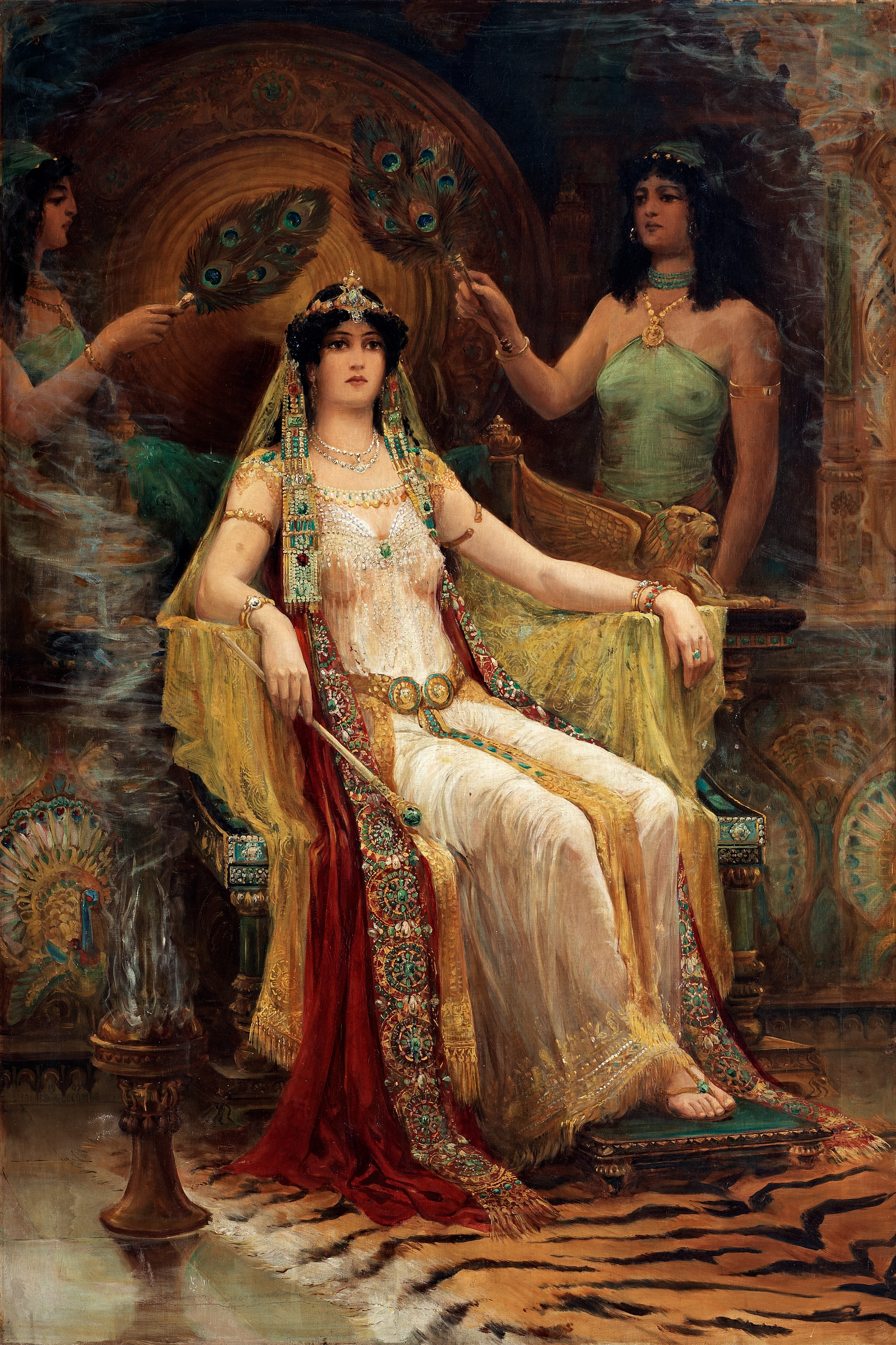
Queen of Sheba, 1907

Edward C. Slocombe was born in London in 1850. When quite young he commenced the study of art in the South Kensington Schools of Science and Art, and in 1869 was admitted as a student to the Royal Academy, where he remained until 1882. During this period he varied his studies with writing articles on art for the press and attempting various styles of engraving. After leaving the Academy he devoted all his time and energy to etching and mezzotinting.

He first exhibited his works at the International Exposition of Vienna, in 1873, where he was awarded a bronze medal. The same year he received a medal at London, and in 1887 a similar distinction at the Adelaide Exposition. In 1883 he commenced exhibiting at the Royal Academy, and showed some work there every year until 1904. At the Salon and the Paris Exposition of 1890, as well as at the Berlin Exhibition of 1891, he was represented by his plate of "Antwerp." also exhibited at the Salons of 1889 and 1891. He was a Fellow of the Royal Society of Painter-Etchers from 1883 to 1915.

Slocombe died in London in 1915.

== Reception ==
Slocombe's work was reviewed in Modern Etchers as such:

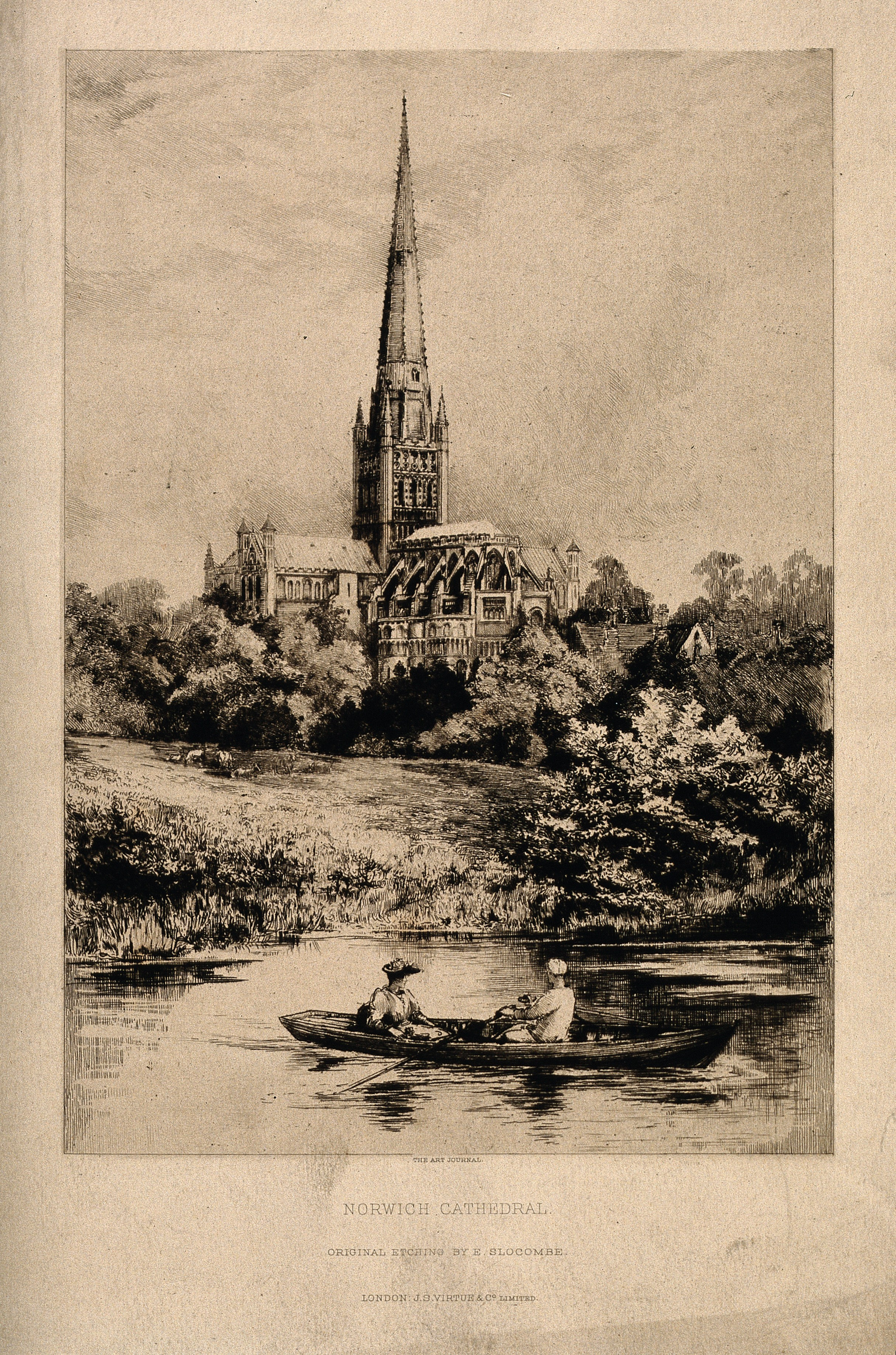
Norwich Cathedral, Norwich, Norfolk: from the river

Slocombe has been very successful in his delineation of English scenery, both rural and architectural, but especially the latter. His views of Oxford, embracing such interesting places as "St. John's," "Magdalene" and "All Saints'" colleges and "Christ Church," were well known and esteemed for their beauty both of composition and etching. "Nerina" and "Madia," two mezzotint plates after the paintings by Perugini, are good examples of that art. The plates in which he shows to most advantage are the "Antwerp," giving a view of the grand place with the cathedral in the background and the "Malines Cathedral." In these works he approaches nearer the great architectural etcher of Europe than he does in any of his other plates. The grouping of the figures in the "Antwerp" is so managed as to add life and variety to the composition without detracting anything from the surroundings. In the "Malines" he has introduced but one figure of prominence, allowing the eye to be entirely absorbed by the massive towers of the church.

— Modern Etchers, p. 114
